= Connected Baltics =

Estonian telecommunications company

- Native name: Connected Baltics
- Industry: Wireless services
- Founded: 2016
- Headquarters: Tallinn, Estonia
- Area served: Estonia
- Key people: Kushtrim Xhakli
- Brands: Sigfox
- Services: IoT
- Website: www.connectedbaltics.com

Connected Baltics is an Estonian telecommunications company founded in 2016. It is the exclusive operator of the Sigfox network in Estonia, a low-power wide-area network (LPWAN) technology for the Internet of Things (IoT). LPWANs enable communication between devices over a large geographical area with low power consumption, making them ideal for applications requiring long battery life and minimal data transmission.

Connected Baltics launched its nationwide Sigfox network in May 2017, achieving coverage for approximately 70% of the Estonian population. This network expansion has facilitated the development of various domestic IoT projects across diverse sectors. Since then, Connected Baltics has partnered with various companies like Telia Eesti, Levira and Helmes. to implement Sigfox technology in various domestic projects.

== Technology ==
Sigfox employs differential binary phase-shift keying (DBPSK) and Gaussian frequency shift keying (GFSK) over the Short-range device band of 868 MHz in Europe, and the Industrial, Scientific and Medical radio band of 902 MHz in the US. It utilizes a wide-reaching signal that passes freely through solid objects, called "Ultra Narrowband" and requires little energy, being termed a "low-power wide-area network" (LPWAN). The network is based on one-hop star topology and requires a mobile operator to carry the generated traffic. The signal can also be used to easily cover large areas and to reach underground objects. As of November 2020, the Sigfox IoT network has covered a total of 5.8 million square kilometers in a total of 72 countries with 1.3 billion of the world population reached.

Sigfox has partnered with a number of firms in the LPWAN industry such as Texas Instruments, Silicon Labs and ON Semiconductor. The ISM radio bands support limited bidirectional communication. The existing standard for Sigfox communications supports up to 140 uplink messages a day, each of which can carry a payload of 12 octets at a data rate of up to 100 bits per second.
