= LTE-M =

Cellular device technology

LTE-M or LTE-MTC ("Long-Term Evolution Machine Type Communication") is a type of low-power wide-area network radio communication technology standard developed by 3GPP for machine-to-machine and Internet of Things (IoT) applications. LTE-M includes eMTC ("enhanced Machine Type Communication"), also known as LTE Cat-M1, whose specification was frozen in June 2016 as part of 3GPP Release 13 (LTE Advanced Pro), as well as LTE Cat-M2.

Competing 3GPP IoT technologies include NB-IoT and EC-GSM-IoT. The advantage of LTE-M over NB-IoT is its comparatively higher data rate, mobility, and voice over the network, but it requires more bandwidth, is more costly, and cannot be put into guard band portion of the frequency band for now. Unlike LTE-M, which supports seamless handover between base stations allowing devices to maintain connectivity while in motion, NB-IoT (Cat-NB1) devices that move between cells must disconnect and re-register with the new base station, making LTE-M better suited for mobile applications such as asset trackers and vehicle telematics. Compared to LTE Release 12 Cat-0 modem, an LTE-M model is claimed to be 80% less expensive (in terms of the bill of materials), support up to 18 dB better coverage, and a battery lifetime that can last up to several years. In April 2024, the Global Mobile Suppliers Association reported that around 258 operators had deployed/launched either NB-IoT or LTE-M networks in 68 countries.

== 3GPP Narrowband Cellular Standards ==
	LTE Cat 1	LTE Cat 1 bis	LTE-M				NB-IoT		EC-GSM-IoT
	LTE Cat 1	LTE Cat 1 bis	LC-LTE/MTCe	eMTC			NB-IoT		EC-GSM-IoT
	LTE Cat 1	LTE Cat 1 bis	LTE Cat 0	LTE Cat M1	LTE Cat M2	non-BL	LTE Cat NB1	LTE Cat NB2	EC-GSM-IoT
3GPP release	Release 8	Release 13	Release 12	Release 13	Release 14		Release 13	Release 14	Release 13
Downlink peak rate	10 Mbit/s		1 Mbit/s		~4 Mbit/s		26 kbit/s	127 kbit/s	474 kbit/s (EDGE) 2 Mbit/s (EGPRS2B)
Uplink peak rate	5 Mbit/s		1 Mbit/s		~7 Mbit/s		66 kbit/s (multi-tone) 16.9 kbit/s (single-tone)	159 kbit/s	474 kbit/s (EDGE) 2 Mbit/s (EGPRS2B)
Latency	50–100 ms		not deployed	10–15ms			1.6–10 s		700 ms – 2 s
Number of antennas	2	1							1–2
Duplex mode	Full duplex		Full or half duplex				Half duplex		
Device receive bandwidth	1.4–20 MHz			1.4 MHz	5 MHz		180 kHz		200 kHz
Receiver chains	2 (MIMO)	1 (SISO)							1–2
Device transmit power	23 dBm			20 / 23 dBm				14 / 20 / 23 dBm	23 / 33 dBm

== Deployments ==
As of March 2019 the Global Mobile Suppliers Association had identified:

- 60 operators in 35 countries investing in LTE-M networks
- 34 of those operators in 24 countries had deployed/launched their networks

As of February 2022, GSMA had listed LTE-M as being launched on 129 commercial networks, with China, India and Indonesia not deploying LTE-M network among major economies.

== See also ==
- NB-IoT
- 6LoWPAN
- Sigfox
- LoRa / LoRaWAN
- NB-Fi
- Weightless (wireless communications)
- DASH7
- LTE User Equipment Categories
- Multefire
- LTE sidelink
- 802.11ah (Wi-FI HaLow)
