= Nordic Semiconductor =

Norwegian multinational semiconductors manufacturer

Nordic Semiconductor ASA
- Formerly: Nordic VLSI
- Type: Public limited
- Traded as: Oslo Stock Exchange: NOD
- Industry: Semiconductors
- Founded: 1983; 43 years ago
- Headquarters: Trondheim, Norway
- Key people: Vegard Wollan (CEO); Birger Steen (Chairman)
- Products: Wireless semiconductor components, integrated circuits
- Revenue: ▼US$542.9 million (2023)
- Operating income: ▼US$4.7 million (2023)
- Net income: ▼US$7.7 million (2023)
- Number of employees: over 1,500 (2023)
- Website: nordicsemi.com

Nordic Semiconductor ASA (formerly known as Nordic VLSI) was founded in 1983 and is a Norwegian fabless technology company with its headquarters in Trondheim, Norway. The company specializes in designing ultra-low-power Wireless communication semiconductors and supporting software for engineers developing and manufacturing Internet of Things (IoT) products.

The company's primary SoC and SiP hardware products support wireless technologies, protocols, and standards like Bluetooth LE and BLE mesh, Wi-Fi, Thread, Zigbee, Matter, LTE-M and NB-IoT, KNX IoT, as well as the 5G standard technology DECT NR+ and 2.4 GHz ISM band communication. nRF Connect SDK (software development kit) integrates Zephyr RTOS and lets developers build size-optimized software.

End-user applications and products include consumer electronics; wireless headphones and LE audio gear; wireless mobile phone accessories ("Appcessories"); wireless gamepad, mouse, and keyboard; intelligent sports equipment; wireless medical and healthcare; remote control; wireless voice-audio applications (e.g., voice over IP); security; wireless navigation hardware; and toys. In addition, industrial and commercial IoT applications include health, asset tracking, metering (gas/water/electricity), smart home and building automation.

Nordic Semiconductor has been ISO 9001 certified by Det Norske Veritas (DNV) since 1996, and the certificate was upgraded to ISO 9001-2000 in 2001. In 1996, Nordic Semiconductor was listed on the Oslo Stock Exchange's SME list.

== History ==
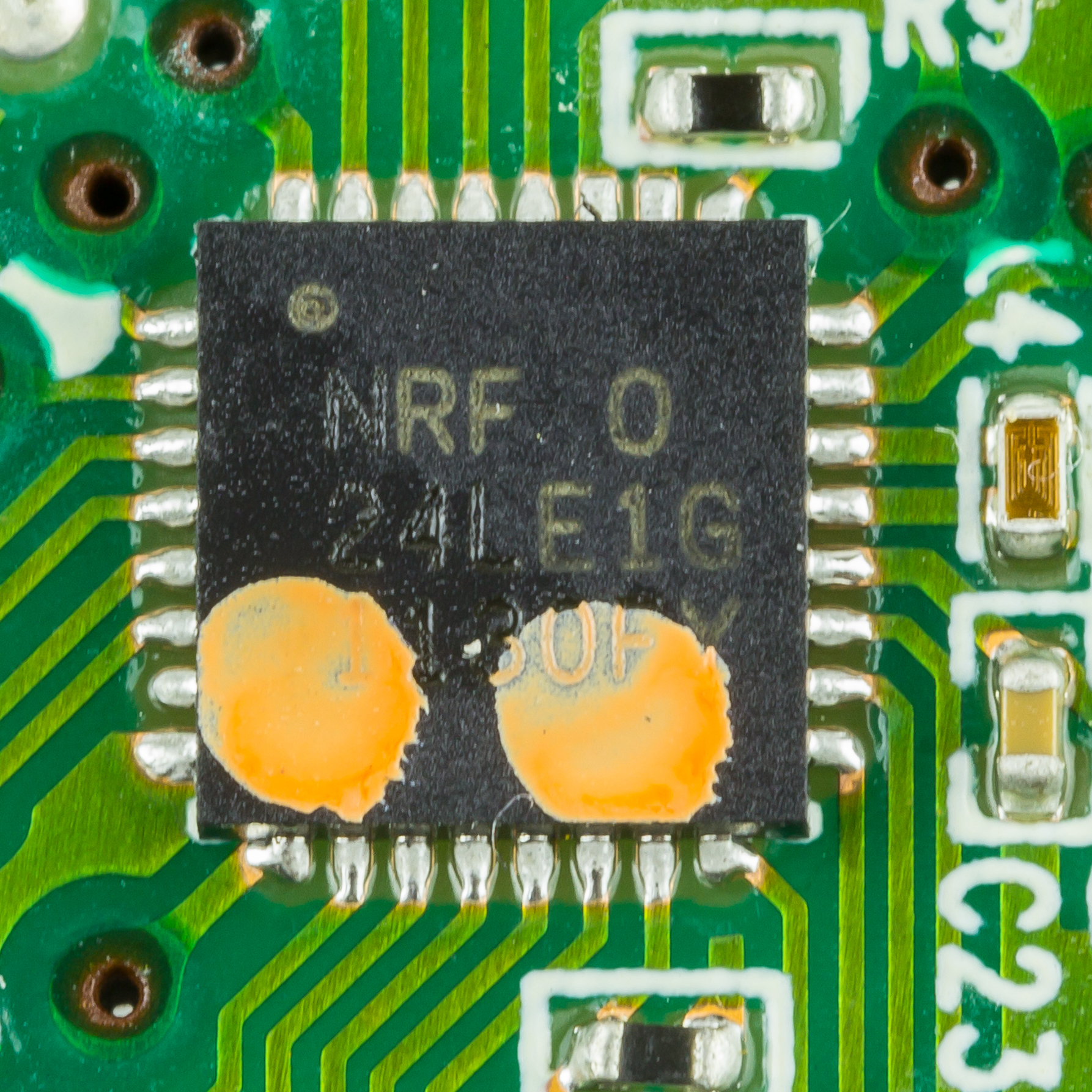
Nordic Semiconductor nRF24LE1 - Wireless System On-Chip Solution

Nordic Semiconductor was initially founded in 1983 as Nordic VLSI (NVLSI) in Trondheim, Norway by four post-graduates from the Norwegian University of Science and Technology. Initially, the company focused on the design of mixed-signal application-specific integrated circuits (ASICs) within the Nordic region. In 1996, the firm went public on the Norwegian stock exchange, where it still trades as of 2023.

In 1998, NVLSI released its first wireless standard products in the 433 MHz ISM band. In 2003 NVLSI was renamed Nordic Semiconductor, often known as Nordic Semi, to reflect the company's focus on ultra-low-power wireless devices. The same year saw the release of Nordic Semiconductor's first wireless devices at 2.4 GHz. Since 2003, Nordic Semiconductor has maintained a clear focus on wireless products for the 2.4 GHz band and has seen its devices used in a wide range of branded consumer electronic products.

Nordic Semiconductor products support short-range low-power wireless through Bluetooth LE, Thread, Zigbee, and proprietary 2.4 GHz protocols; and low-power cellular IoT through LTE-M and NB-IoT.

2012 saw the release of the third generation of ultra-low-power wireless products. This family of products is named the nRF51 series, and incorporates the ARM Cortex-M series microcontrollers at their core.

In 2015 Nordic Semiconductor introduced new 2.4 GHz ISM band SoC series, the nRF52 Series with ARM Cortex-M4 as their core.

In February 2016, the company signed the UN Global Compact.

In January 2018, Nordic Semiconductor introduced its first cellular product, the nRF91 series. With the nRF9160 system in a package (SiP), the company expanded from Bluetooth LE and short-range radio applications into cellular network solutions. The main focus is on cellular IoT by supporting LTE-M and NB-IoT.

In November 2019, Nordic Semiconductor introduced a flagship SoC containing dual-core ARM Cortex-M33 processors and a multi-protocol radio stack (NFC/BLE/BLE mesh/Zigbee/Thread/others), the nRF53 series.

In 2022, Nordic Semiconductor unveiled a low-power, dual-band Wi-Fi 6 companion chip, the nRF70 Series. ICs compatible with the nRF7002 include the nRF52 and nRF53 Bluetooth SoCs and the nRF91 cellular SiP, although Nordic claims that the device can also be used with non-Nordic host devices.

In August 2023, it was announced Nordic Semiconductor had entered into an agreement to acquire the IP portfolio of San Diego-headquartered artificial intelligence and machine learning company, Atlazo.

In October 2023, Nordic Semiconductor announced the second product, nRF54L Series, in its fourth generation of Bluetooth® Low Energy Systems-on-Chip (SoCs) family, the nRF54.

In December 2023, Nordic Semiconductor announced that after 22 years at the helm, Svenn-Tore will step down from the role of CEO. He will be replaced by Vegard Wollan, the co-inventor of the AVR microcontroller architecture.

In May 2024, the company's ESG risk rating was low at just 13.8%.

== Products ==
Nordic Semiconductor designs and produces SoC, SiP, and connectivity solutions for the ISM bands at 5 GHz, 2.4 GHz and 868/915 MHz bands. The products operate on low power, enabling wireless and IoT applications to use little battery and run on harvested energy.

Current products include SoCs incorporating the ARM Cortex-M0, ARM Cortex-M4 and ARM Cortex-M33 microcontroller cores.

Popular products include the nRF24L01+ and the nRF24LE1, both using the lightweight and proprietary "Enhanced ShockBurst" (ESB) protocol stack in 2.4 GHz ISM band. The nRF24L01+ is a simple transceiver with some logic to implement the protocol stack and is connected to a microcontroller via an SPI bus, while the nRF24LE1 can be seen as an nRF24L01 and a microcontroller in the same chip.

=== Cellular IoT ===
==== nRF91 Series SiP ====
The nRF9160 SiP expanded Nordic Semiconductor's lineup from mainly focusing on Bluetooth LE and other short range wireless protocol SoCs into the realm of connected devices using the cellular network for internet connectivity. The series offers LTE-M and NB-IoT connectivity.

=== Wi-Fi ===
==== nRF70 Series ====
A Wi-Fi companion IC is designed to provide Wi-Fi connectivity and functionality to existing Nordic products. Unlike other Nordic solutions, the first product, nRF7002, is strictly for connectivity.

=== Multi-protocol ===
==== nRF54 Series SoC ====
The nRF54 Series SoC makes it possible to reduce BOM, replacing external components through a highly integrated SoC with multiple ARM Cortex-M33 processors running up to 320 MHz in conjunction with RISC-V coprocessors. nRF54H20 touts efficient processing, ultra-low power radio, and minimal sleep currents, multiprotocol radio with 10 dBm TX power, -100 dBm RX sensitivity for Bluetooth LE and -104 dBm for 802.15.4., PSA Level 3 certification, secure boot, secure firmware update, secure storage, and protection against physical attacks. In EEMBC ULPMark-CM benchmarking, configured for maximum processing efficiency, the nRF54H20 scores 170 with 515 CoreMark. Configured for maximum processing performance, the nRF54H20 scores 132 with 1290 CoreMark. Compared to the nRF54H Series' GlobalFoundries 22FDX® (22 nm) process, nRF54L Series features a new hardware architecture fabricated using TSMC’s 22ULL® (22 nm) process technology.

==== nRF53 Series SoC ====
The nRF5340 SoC is the world's first dual-core ARM Cortex-M33 SoC (128MHz + 64MHz), released in 2020. This is Nordic's new generation of wireless SoCs with a separate processor core to handle connectivity, thus freeing up resources for handling more demanding applications on the main processor's core without compromising on the connectivity.

==== nRF52 Series SoCs ====
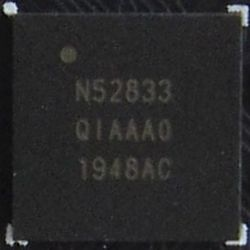
nRF52833 on a micro bit v2

The nRF52 Series SoCs was the second short-range wireless SoCs from Nordic Semiconductor, building on its experience developing the nRF51 Series. The nRF52 series, especially the nRF52840 and nRF52833, is very successful and exists in millions of popular consumer devices in the world today, among them wireless mice, keyboards and audio devices. The popularity of Nordic's nRF52 series allows Nordic Semiconductor to maintain a 40% worldwide market share in the Bluetooth LE segment.

The nRF52833 SoC features a 64 MHz ARM Cortex-M4. This SoC supports an extended temperature range of -40˚C to 105˚C. The SoC has a 1:4 RAM to Flash storage ratio (128 KB : 512 KB). Being a wireless-focused chip, the nRF52833 is equipped with an output power of +8 dBm.

==== nRF51 Series SoCs ====
The nRF51 Series SoCs was the first short-range wireless SoC series from Nordic Semiconductor; it was superseded by the nRF52 Series SoCs.

=== Power management (nPM) ===
Dedicated Power Management ICs (PMIC) integrate a number of functions to reduce the size, improve the power efficiency and maximise the system's battery life. The nPM Series supports power management, battery charging, and state-of-charge prediction using integrated battery current, voltage, and temperature measurements for precision estimation.

=== Range extenders (nRF21) ===
The transmit (TX) output power and the receiver sensitivity directly influence the link budget of a connection. An RF front-end module (FEM) increases the range at which two wireless devices can communicate while enhancing link robustness. nRF21540 RF FEM can boost wireless range up to 10x.

=== Cloud services ===
nRF Cloud is a platform for IoT cloud services for the nRF Series of wireless devices, including location services and Firmware Over-The-Air (FOTA).

=== Development software ===
nRF Connect SDK is a software development kit for the nRF Series of wireless devices.

== Wireless technologies and protocols ==
Nordic Semiconductor provides hardware and software for several wireless technologies and protocols.

- Cellular IoT (LTE-M/NB-IoT)
  - Internet of Things (IoT) devices use existing cellular networks, such as those used for mobile phones, to communicate over long distances and through walls and other barriers with greater flexibility and coverage than other wireless communication technologies.
- DECT NR+
  - DECT Next Generation is an evolution of the DECT standard that allows any company or organization to build its own private 5G network and run and optimize as they wish.
- Wi-Fi
  - By maximizing Wi-Fi’s low-power potential, Wi-Fi can be introduced in applications such as sensor networks, smart speakers, security cameras, home appliances, robot vacuums, and more.
- Bluetooth Low Energy
  - Bluetooth Low Energy (BLE) is a wireless personal area network technology designed for use with low-power devices.
- Bluetooth LE Audio
  - A new Bluetooth audio standard designed to reduce power consumption and improve the performance and functionality of Bluetooth audio devices such as wireless headphones and speakers.
- Bluetooth Direction Finding
- Bluetooth Mesh
- Matter for smart home applications
  - Matter uses Thread, Wi-Fi, Ethernet and Bluetooth LE to make it possible for developers to create secure and interoperable products for the major smart home ecosystems.
- Thread
- Zigbee
- ANT+
- 2.4 GHz proprietary
- Amazon Sidewalk
- Apple Find My network

== Industry associations ==
Nordic Semiconductor is a member of the ANT+ Alliance, Bluetooth Special Interest Group, KNX Association, Thread Group, Connectivity Standards Alliance, Wi-Fi Alliance, GSMA, and the Zephyr Project.

Nordic Semiconductor has announced a collaboration with Qualcomm, NXP, Bosch and Infineon, to launch a joint company focused on RISC-V.

== Clones ==
Some clones of Nordic Semiconductor's chips can be found on the market, such as the SI24R1 and the BK2421. They often demonstrate inferior receiver sensitivity and higher power consumption, although they may add additional features such as higher maximal transmission power.

== Locations ==
Nordic Semiconductor is headquartered in Trondheim, Norway. R&D offices are located in Portland (US), Krakow and Wrocław (Poland), Oulu, Espoo, Tampere and Turku (Finland), Hyderabad (India), Bristol and Hertfordshire (UK), Stockholm and Lund (Sweden), and in Oslo and Trondheim (Norway). Technical support or sales offices are located in Oslo (Norway), San Diego (US), Beijing, Shanghai, Shenzhen and Hong Kong (China), Taipei (Taiwan), Manila (the Philippines), Yokohama (Japan), Seoul (South Korea), Düsseldorf (Germany), Eindhoven (the Netherlands) and London (UK).
