= ISO/IEC 18000-3 =

International standard for passive RFID item level identification

ISO/IEC 18000-3 is an international standard for passive RFID item level identification and describes the parameters for air interface communications at 13.56 MHz. The target markets for MODE 2 are in tagging systems for manufacturing, logistics, retail, transport and airline baggage. MODE 2 is especially suitable for high speed bulk conveyor fed applications.

== General description ==
MODE 2 RFID tags are passive deriving their power from the interrogating signal generated by an RFID interrogator. Power is transferred from the interrogator to the tag by a high-frequency magnetic field using coupled antennae coils in the reader and the tag. The powering field frequency is 13.56 MHz ± 7 kHz.

Dialogue between the interrogator and the tag is conducted on an Interrogator-Talks-First (ITF) basis. Following activation of the tag by the interrogator’s interrogating signal the tag waits silently for a valid command. After receiving a valid command the tag transmits a reply in response to the command. The air interface operates as a full-duplex communication link. The interrogator operates with full-duplex transmissions being able to transmit commands while simultaneously receiving multiple tag replies. Tags operate with half-duplex transmissions.

Commands are transmitted from the interrogator to the tag by phase-jitter modulation (PJM) of the powering field. PJM transmits data as very small phase changes in the powering field. There is no reduction in the transfer of power to the tag during PJM, and the bandwidth of PJM is no wider than the original double-sided spectrum of the data. The PJM sideband levels and data rates are decoupled, allowing the sideband levels to be set at any arbitrary level without affecting the data rate. The command data rate is 423.75 kbit/s encoded using modified frequency modulation (MFM).

Tags reply to the interrogator by inductive coupling whereby the voltage across the tag antenna coil is modulated by a subcarrier. The subcarrier is derived from division of the powering field frequency. Tags can select from one of eight subcarrier frequencies between 969 kHz and 3013 kHz. The reply data rate is 105.9375 kbit/s encoded using MFM and modulated onto the subcarrier as binary phase-shift keying (BPSK). To ensure that tags replying on different channels are simultaneously received, tag replies are band-limited to reduce data and subcarrier harmonic levels.

Multiple-tag identification is performed using a combination of frequency-division multiple access and time-division multiple access (FTDMA). There are eight reply channels available for tags to use. In response to a valid command each tag randomly selects a channel on which to transmit its reply. The reply is transmitted once using the selected channel. Upon receiving the next valid command each tag randomly selects a new channel and transmits the reply using the newly selected channel. This method of reply frequency hopping using random channel selection is repeated for each subsequent valid command. The interrogator can selectively mute identified tags to remove them from the identification process. When a tag is muted, the tag will not transmit any replies. In addition to random channel selection the tags can randomly mute individual replies. When a reply is muted, the tag will not transmit that reply. Random muting is necessary when identifying very large populations of tags during singulation. All FTDMA frequency and time parameters are defined by the command.

All commands are time-stamped, and tags store the first time stamp received after entering an interrogator. The stored time stamp defines precisely when the tag first entered the interrogator and provides a high-resolution method of determining tag order, which is decoupled from the speed of identification. Tag temporary settings, such as the time stamp, are stored in temporary random-access memory (TRAM) that retains data contents during power outages caused by switching of the powering field in orientation-insensitive interrogators.

== Applications ==
Primary applications are in RFID tags for use in gaming, healthcare, pharmaceuticals, document and media management. The German identity card contains an ISO/IEC 18000-3 and ISO/IEC 14443 type A compatible 13.56 MHz RFID chip that uses the ISO/IEC 7816 protocols.

== See also ==
- DASH7 Alliance Protocol, an open source Wireless Sensor and Actuator Network protocol defined in ISO 18000-7
- ISO/IEC 18000-7, air interface standard for RFID in the 433 MHz band
