= Global Mobile Suppliers Association =

Trade association

Global mobile Suppliers Association
- Abbreviation: GSA
- Type: Industry trade body
- Purpose: Representing companies engaged in the supply of infrastructure, semiconductors, test equipment, devices, applications and support services in the mobile telecommunications industry
- Website: gsacom.com

The Global mobile Suppliers Association (GSA) is a not-for-profit industry organisation representing suppliers in the mobile communication industry. GSA actively promotes 3GPP technology such as 3G; 4G; 5G. GSA is a market representation partner in 3GPP and co-operates with organisations including COAI, ETSI, GSMA, ICU, ITU, European Conference of Postal and Telecommunications Administrations (CEPT-ECC), other regional regulatory bodies and other industry associations.

The GSA Spectrum Group is a large industry advocacy team of more than 185 participants from GSA Executive Member companies formed into 7 regional and country teams and other focused groups. GSA actively cooperates on spectrum related promotion with the GSM Association (GSMA), another organization with similar stated goals representing the mobile network operator community. GSA is also an Associate Member of APT (Asia region), ATU (Africa) and CITEL (LatAm & USA/Canada).

== GAMBoD ==
The GSA analyser for mobile broadband data (GAMBoD) is a search and analysis tool developed by GSA to enable searches of mobile devices and new global data on mobile broadband networks, technologies and spectrum (NTS), mobile chipsets, Mobile Operators, Fixed Wireless devices, and Private Mobile Networks. The Devices database can be searched by supplier, form factor, features, peak downlink and uplink speeds, and operating frequency. The NTS database can be searched by mobile broadband (MBB) technology, feature, UE category, downlink speed, spectrum bands used and can be segmented by region.

== Special Interest Groups and Forums ==
In 2021 GSA established the 4G-5G Fixed Wireless Access Forum to promote this segment of the mobile industry. The forum has over 50 Members and Observers and produces ecosystem reports and bi-annual plenaries to showcase Fixed Wireless (FWA) deployments. The Private Mobile Networks (PMN) Special Interest Group (SIG) was established in 2022 to track and report on deployments of non-public mobile networks, in enterprises and industries. In 2025, GSA launched a 5G RedCap working group.

== Research areas ==
GSA produces around 140 industry reports, white-papers, presentations, charts and industry snapshots each year based on the data from its GAMBoD databases. Many reports are free to download once registered and logged into the web site. More detailed reports are available for Members and Associates.

Areas of research include:

- 4G-5G Ecosystem
- Spectrum, networks and technologies
- Fixed Wireless Access
- Private Mobile Networks
- 5G RedCap
- 5G-Advanced
- NB-IoT and LTE-M
- VoLTE, ViLTE and VoNR
- eMBMS
- C-V2X

== Membership ==
Executive Members

- Apple
- Ericsson
- Huawei
- Intel
- MediaTek
- Nokia
- Qualcomm
- Samsung
- ZTE

Members

- Queen's University Belfast, Centre for Wireless Innovation
- Casa Systems
- Interdigital
- Keysight Technologies
- Radisys
- Viavi

Associates - ~85 including

- Analysys Mason
- Boston Consulting Group
- ComReg
- CTIA
- Doro AB
- HP Enterprises
- IFT (Instituto Federal de Telecomunicaciones)
- ITU (International Telecommunication Union)
- LGS Innovations
- Mavenir
- Microsoft
- Ofcom
- Plum Consulting
- Quectel
- Rohde & Schwarz
- Sony
- Syniverse
- Vodacom SA

== See also ==
- Supplier association
