= NRF51 series =

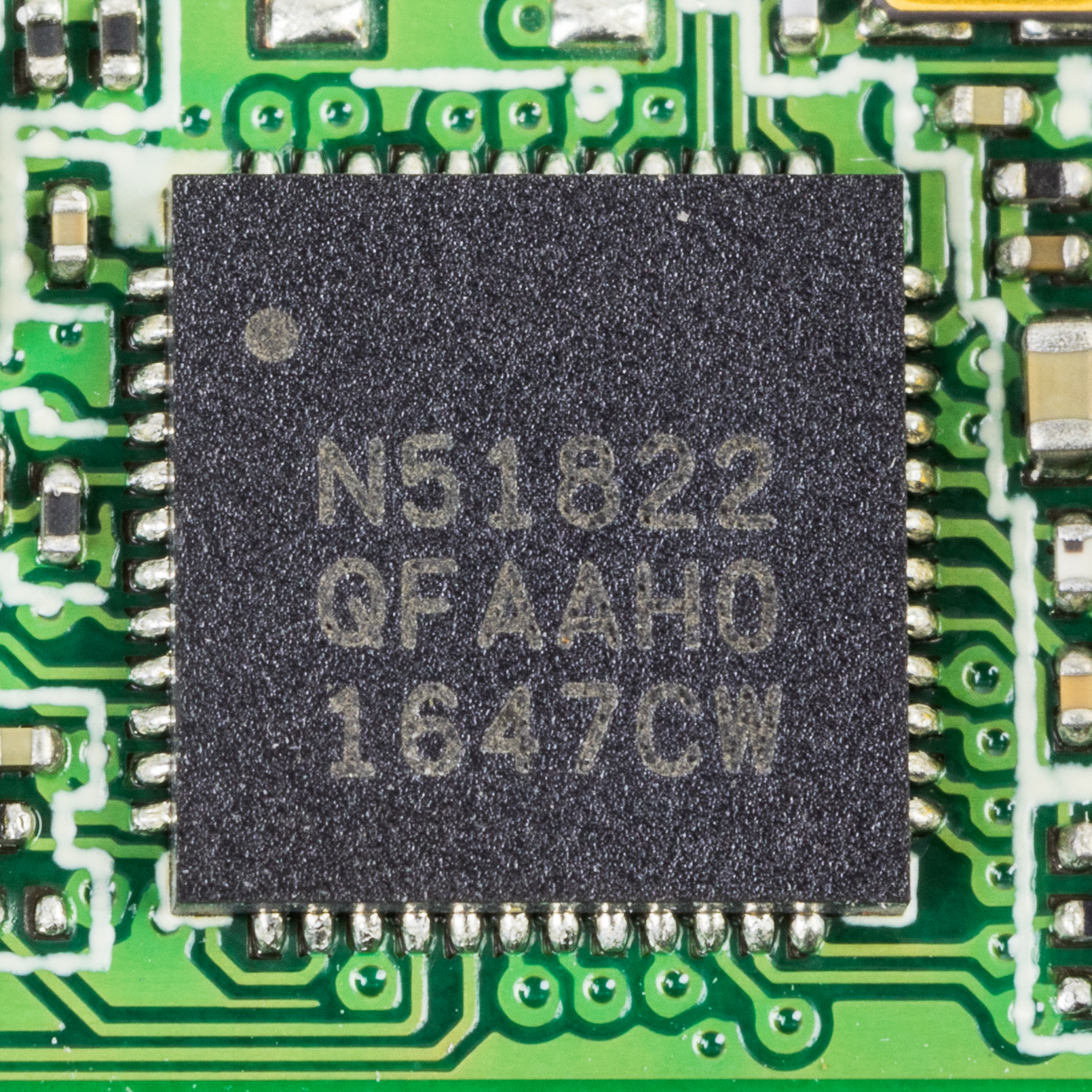
nRF51822

The nRF51 Series SoCs are a family of ultra low-power wireless SoCs from Nordic Semiconductor. The nRF51 series are designed to enable a wide range of wireless embedded systems and consumer electronic products in many different fields of wireless connectivity including wearable devices, computer peripherals, mobile phone accessories, security devices and sensor applications. The nRF51 series devices support a range of ultra low-power wireless communication protocols including: Bluetooth low energy, ANT, ANT+ and 2.4 GHz proprietary protocols.

== Radio architecture ==
The nRF51 series devices employ Nordic Semiconductor's 3rd generation 2.4 GHz radio architecture. This radio uses narrow-band GFSK modulation and is frequency adaptable across the 2.4 GHz ISM band.

== Key features ==
- ARM Cortex-M0 microcontroller
- Programmable GPIO
- Bespoke power management system
- Programmable Peripheral Interconnect system
- Radio packet DMA (Direct Memory Access)
- 4dBm output power
- Independent software architecture
