= Weightless (wireless communications) =

Weightless was a set of low-power wide-area network (LPWAN) Wireless technology specifications for exchanging data between a base station and many of machines around it.

== History ==
Cambridge Wireless held an event at the Moller Centre in Cambridge, United Kingdom on September 30, 2011. Neul, Landis+Gyr, Cable & Wireless, and ARM Holdings provided presentations. The Weightless Special Interest Group promoted the technology (SIG), announced on December 7, 2012. The group was led by William Webb, a professor at Cambridge and a founder of the company Neul. A subsequent event was held in September 2013, when version 1.0 was published.

The name Weightless was chosen to reflect the intention at a low overhead per transmission for devices that need to communicate just a low amounts of data. The Weightless logo appears in uppercase letters with the 'W' appearing in the top-right corner of a light blue box with a solid blue line above it.

In September 2014, Neul was acquired by Huawei for an estimated $25 million. By 2015, the company Nwave Technologies announced deployments in Copenhagen, Denmark, and Esbjerg, Denmark. However, observers noted no products on the market. Ubiik, a company based in Taiwan, announced pre-orders in 2017.

== Implementation ==
Weightless-N uses a differential binary phase shift keying (DBPSK) digital modulation scheme to transmit within narrow frequency bands using a frequency hopping algorithm for interference mitigation and enhanced security. It provides encryption and implicit authentication using a shared secret key regime to encode transmitted information via a 128-bit AES algorithm. The technology supports mobility with the network automatically routing terminal messages to the correct destination. Multiple networks, typically operated by different companies, are enabled and can be co-located. Each base station queries a central database to determine which network the terminal is registered to decode and route data accordingly.

Weightless-W uses time-division duplex operation with frequency hopping and variable spreading factors to increase range and accommodate low-power devices in frequency bands, or channels, within the terrestrial television broadcast band. Channels used by a nearby television transmitter are identified and left unaffected, while channels not being used for broadcasting television can be allocated for use by Weightless devices.

A network of base stations communicates with the Internet, or a private network, to pass information from devices to a computer system; and data back to the devices. The downlink to devices uses time slots (TDMA), and the uplink to the base station is divided into sub-channels so that several devices can communicate with the base station.

Initially, there were three published Weightless connectivity standards Weightless-P, Weightless-N, and Weightless-W. Weightless-N was an uplink-only LPWAN technology. Weightless W was designed to operate in the TV whitespace. Weightless-P, with bi-directional, narrowband technology intended to be operated in licensed and unlicensed ISM frequencies, was then just called "Weightless."

=== Communication and Connection ===
A base station transmits a Weightless frame received by a few thousand devices. The devices are allocated a specific time and frequency to transfer their data back to the base station. The base station is connected to the Internet or a private network. The base station accesses a database to identify the frequencies or channels that it can use without interfering with terrestrial television broadcasts in its local area.

Weightless is a wireless communications protocol for machine-to-machine (M2M) communications known as the Internet of things (IoT) – over distances ranging from a few meters to about 10 km.

=== Related technologies ===
Other technologies which use the channels not used for terrestrial television broadcast in a particular area are also said to be in development. One is Wi-Fi under the standard IEEE 802.11af. The IEEE 802.22 standard defines a MAC and PHY layer for TV white spaces that comply with the FCC and international standards for broadcasting in this spectrum. It also defines a general protocol model for negotiating and selecting a shared spectrum band for device operation. A Weightless Radio implementation would comply with this standard to cooperatively share the available spectrum.

Another technology is developed by the company Sigfox.

== Specifications and features ==
The original Weightless specification was developed for machine-to-machine, low-cost, low-power communication system for use in the white space between TV channels in 2011 by engineers working at Neul in Cambridge, UK. The Weightless-W specification is based on time-division duplex technology with spread spectrum frequency hopping in an attempt to minimise the impact of interference and with variable spreading factors in an attempt to increase range (at the expense of lower data rate) and to accommodate low power devices with low data rates.

=== Weightless v1.0 ===
The formal Weightless-W Standard was published in February 2013. The Weightless-N Standard was published in May 2015. For networks using Weightless-W technology, a base station queries a database which identifies the channels that are being used for terrestrial television broadcast in its local area. The channels not in use – the so-called white space – can be used by the base station to communicate with terminals using the Weightless-W protocol. Terminal endpoints were designed to be low-cost devices using minimal power so that they could work autonomously for up to several years.

=== Air interface ===
The Weightless-W protocol operates in the TV channels band. The Weightless-W protocol divides the band into channels. A database is queried by a base station to determine which channels are in use by terrestrial television broadcast stations in the area, and which ones are free for use by white space devices (such as those using Weightless). A range of modulation and encoding techniques are used to permit each base station to communicate at a variety of speeds with terminals, some of which may be nearby and others several km away. Data rates may vary depending on the distance and the presence of radio interference – the typical range is alleged to be between about 0.1 Mbit/s and 16 Mbit/s. The design of the air interface and protocol minimises the costs of the equipment and its power consumption. A broadband downlink from a base station to a terminal uses single carrier in an unused 6 MHz (for US) or 8 MHz (for UK) TV channel.

== See also ==
- Wimax
- Telemetry
- DASH7
