= Supply network =

A supply network is a pattern of temporal and spatial processes carried out at facility nodes and over distribution links, which adds value for customers through the manufacturing and delivery of products. It comprises the general state of business affairs in which all kinds of material (raw materials, work in process and finished products) are transformed and moved between various points to maximize the value added for customers. In the semiconductor industry, for example, work-in-process moves from fabrication to assembly, and then to the test house.

The term "supply network" refers to the high-tech phenomenon of contract manufacturing where the brand owner does not touch the product. Instead, she coordinates with contract manufacturers and component suppliers who ship components to the brand owner. This business practice requires the brand owner to stay in touch with multiple parties or "network" at once.

A supply chain is a special instance of a supply network in which raw materials, intermediate materials and finished goods are procured exclusively as products through a chain of processes that supply one another. John Mills et al. have suggested that the addition of the term "network" to the concept of supply chain management has extended supply chain management into a more strategic orientation. In their analysis, internal connections such as links between a company's purchasing department and the staff responsible for new product development would form part of a supply network, alongside the connections to players within the supply chain.

A supplier association can also be seen as a form of supply network.

== Resilience in supply networks ==
A resilient supply network effectively aligns its strategy, operations, management systems, governance structure, and decision-support capabilities so that it can uncover and adjust to continually changing risks, endure disruptions to its primary earnings drivers, and create advantages over less adaptive competitors. Moreover, it has the capability to respond rapidly to unforeseen changes, even chaotic disruption. The resilience of a supply network is the ability to bounce back – and, in fact, to bounce forward with speed, determination and precision. In recent studies, resilience is regarded as the next phase in the evolution of traditional, place-centric enterprise structures to highly virtualized, customer-centric structures that enable people to work anytime, anywhere.

Resilient supply networks should align their strategies and operations to adapt to risk that affects network capacities. There are 4 levels of supply chain resilience:

1. reactive supply chain management.
2. internal supply chain integration with planned buffers.
3. collaboration across extended supply chain networks.
4. a dynamic supply chain adaptation and flexibility.

=== Strategic resilience ===
From the strategic resilient viewpoint, a supply network must dynamically reinvent business models and strategies as circumstances change. It is not about responding to a one-time crisis, or just having a flexible supply chain. It is about continuously anticipating and adjusting to discontinuities that can permanently impair the value preposition of a core business with focus on delivering customer satisfaction. Strategic resilience requires continuous innovation with respect to product structures, processes, but also corporate behaviour. Renewal can be regarded as the natural consequence of a supply network’s innate strategic resilience.

=== Operational resilience ===
In terms of operational resilience, the supply networks must respond to the ups and downs of the business cycle or to quickly rebalance product-service mix, processes, and supply chain, by bolstering enterprises agility, flexibility and robustness in the face of changing environments.

== Research ==
There are two distinct types of supply network research:

- descriptive studies of industrial supply networks
- prescriptive research into supply chain management focussing on strategic and operational management questions.

Early supply network descriptive research looked at the automotive industry, comparing the Japanese keiretsu with western manufacturing networks. Recent research also considers how buyers address social responsibility in supply networks, finding that audit strategies can be optimized by prioritizing the "least valuable unaudited supplier" based on its contribution to overall production value and network structure. Some research has considered supply network design characteristics and their impact on reliability.

== See also ==
- Document automation#In supply chain management
- Supply network operations
- Value network
- Value network analysis
- Logistics
