= Very minimum shift keying =

Very minimum shift keying, or VMSK, modulation, is one of several ultra-narrow-band modulation (UNBM) methods indeterminately claimed to send high-speed digital data through very low bandwidth (or narrowband) channels.

VMSK is a type of phase-shift keying, not related to minimum shift keying.

== Claims versus analysis ==
VMSK was introduced in 1998 as a cellular telephone modulating method. Hardware was sent to and tested by Vodafone, Sprint and AT&T. The method was reported on favorably by William C.Y. Lee, V.P. of Vodafone Airtouch, in "Lee's Essentials of Wireless Communications", McGraw Hill 2001. There have been individuals who have made an analysis based on positive group delay filters that claim the method does not work; however, VMSK, like all ultra-narrow band modulation methods uses negative- or zero-delay filters.

Walker claims that with VMSK, "Efficiencies up to 15 bits/s/Hz are now being achieved in usable hardware with C/N ratios better than that obtainable using FM, BPSK or QPSK."

Analysis by third parties (Karn and Tomazic) have concluded that "no ultra narrow band modulation (UNBM) method, which includes very minimum shift keying (VMSK) and VPSK, can have substantially greater efficiency than conventional methods."

On a spectrum analyzer, a VMSK signal looks narrow. However, the actual bandwidth required to avoid interference is much wider. One analyst says "the spectral efficiency claims being made for VMSK are hogwash", regardless of the filter used.

== Personalities ==
VMSK is promoted primarily by H. R. Walker, owner of the "Welcome to the Ultra Narrowband Club" website, and author of several papers and publications on the arguments. Mr. Walker has written about his ideas in telecommunications sector publications such as Microwaves & RF, as well as in a co-authored book chapter.

== Legal issues ==
It was reported in 2000 that "AlphaCom Communications holds patent rights to the non-Nyquist filters and other aspects of VMSK and VMSK/2 technology. The company claimed to have secured these rights as a result of a contract with H.R. Walker, doing business as Pegasus Data Systems, to purchase the patents and fund further R&D. AlphaCom defaulted on the contract and a legal dispute over ownership arose. A 2003 Securities and Exchange Commission charge against AlphaCom and its principals alleges that "defendants raised these funds by falsely representing that AlphaCom owned exclusive rights to novel Internet technologies, Network Utilities (NU) and Very Minimal Shift Keying (VMSK), that were supposed to increase Internet downloading speeds and the speed of access to the Internet. Many of these claims could not be supported."

In order to avoid further legal costs, Walker agreed to surrender the ownership of the VMSK patents US 5,930,303 and US 6,748,022 to AlphaCom in return for AlphaCom making no further claims against Walker or Pegasus regarding any newer methods. The special near zero group delay filters required are claimed by Walker to be non patentable due to prior publication.

In 2002, "Walker said the company (Pegasus Data Systems) was delayed when one of its financial backers (AlphaCom) went out of business in late 2000. Now armed with new backers, the company is again moving forward with a new method, he said."

In 2007, Compress Technologies, Inc., announced on their web site that they had "acquired VMSK Technology." Their domain name has since been acquired by someone else.
