= British Educational Suppliers Association =

British trade association

British Educational Suppliers Association (BESA) is a British trade association of manufacturers and distributors of equipment for the education market. Its members supply to both the UK and international markets.

The association has more than 400 members, with a combined annual turnover in excess of £1.8 billion. All BESA members subscribe to a code of practice intended to offer buyers peace of mind. In 1996, the association sued the Yorkshire Purchasing Organisation, claiming that the council-owned body was engaging in unfair competition by trading outside its local area. In 2009, the association predicted a drop in IT spending by schools.

== See also ==
- Supplier association
