= Link Labs =

- Industry: Internet of things
- Founded: 2014; 12 years ago
- Founder: Brian Ray
- Headquarters: Annapolis, Maryland, United States
- Products: Symphony Link, AirFinder
- Website: link-labs.com

Link Labs is an American company based in Annapolis, Maryland, that develops computer network technology for business and industrial customers. Link Labs technologies are marketed for Internet of things (IoT) applications and devices.

== History ==
Link Labs was founded in 2014 by Brian Ray and three engineers from the Johns Hopkins Applied Physics Laboratory. Ray, a United States Naval Academy graduate and former submarine officer, previously led a Johns Hopkins APL team focused on communications and geolocation for the U.S. intelligence community.

In August 2015, the company raised a $5.7 million Series A funding round. The round was led by TCP Venture Capital, with participation from Blu Venture Investors, Inflection Point Partners, and the state-run Maryland Venture Fund, which contributed $500,000. By 2024, the company had accumulated approximately $20 million in venture funding, which included a Series B round that closed in April 2024.

== Products ==
=== Symphony Link ===
Symphony Link is an LPWAN protocol for bidirectional sensor communication. It supports up to 250,000 endpoints per gateway, a 7-mile (11 km) range, over-the-air firmware upgrades, and compressed data acknowledgements.

=== AirFinder ===
AirFinder is an RTLS division utilizing iBeacon and BLE for asset and personnel tracking in healthcare, manufacturing, and logistics. Industry surveys indicate that workflow redesign and data quality are the main factors for scaling such tracking deployments from pilots to operational use.

== Partnerships ==
In August 2015, Link Labs partnered with UK-based Stream Technologies to integrate subscription, billing, and data-management services into its platforms.

In June 2016, the Stanley Mechanical Solutions division of Stanley Black & Decker utilized Link Labs hardware to develop its Shelter school-safety system.

In October 2016, M2M Spectrum Networks partnered with Link Labs to deploy the Symphony Link protocol across its licensed machine-to-machine network.

== See also ==
- LPWAN
