= Wize technology =

Wize is a registered trademark referring to a low‑power, long‑range, two‑way radio communication technology operating in the 169 MHz frequency range. While originally designed for the 169 MHz frequency) band, the Wize technology is flexible and can be adapted to nearby frequency bands as well. Its current specification is built on the European standard 13757‑x, established by the European Union to support the rollout of smart metering systems. Since 2017, this open standard has also been available for broader IoT applications.

Wize enables the networking of connected objects that can be difficult to access, such as buried, isolated, or deeply buried systems. The protocol can also resolve specific technical constraints. The use of Wize is particularly notable in the energy and dedicated infrastructure sectors for the smart city: water, gas, electricity, air, cathodic protection, parking...

== History ==
=== 169 MHz radio frequency spectrum ===
The 169 MHz radio frequency band (169.4 - 169.8125 MHz more precisely), formerly known as ERMES band, was historically used by pager type services.

When this service ended, the European Conference of Postal and Telecommunications Administrations (CEPT) and its Electronic Communications Committee (ECC) decided in 2005 to allocate this frequency for a number of new use cases, including remote meter reading. The low value of the frequency, as well as the potential to transmit at up to 500 mW, makes this band a high-performance technical solution for remote meter reading taking into account the difficult radio access conditions (e.g. deep inside a building) and the necessity to be battery-powered for a long period of time (up to 20 years).

The ISM 169 MHz radio frequency spectrum is open and royalty-free in Europe, working as a license-free band for Short-range devices, with the common spectrum occupancy restrictions these shared spectrum have.

In 2005, Suez, a private water utility, developed an AMI infrastructure based on the 169 MHz frequency to run smart water metering deployments across Europe, mainly in France, Spain and Portugal.

In 2011, Malta's Water Services Corporation (WSC) adopted the 169 MHz frequency band for its smart water metering project, becoming the first country in the world to build a nationwide smart grid within a fully integrated water system.

=== The EN13757 standard communication system ===
The EN13757-4 European standard is part of a metering standard suite managed by the CEN TC294 technical committee. The CEN TC294 standardizes communication for gas, water and heat meters as well as for heat cost allocators. EN13757-4 defines the wireless low level interface of this standard, including physical and MAC layers. This standard includes a long list of variants.

In 2012, the emergence of the EN13757-4/N2 variant within the CEN TC294 technical committee constituted a turning point.

The EN13757-4 mode N is the physical layer of Wize technology. The application layer of the Wize protocol is referenced in the EN13757 standard family and a liaison between the Wize Alliance, created in 2018, and the CEN technical committee "TC294" was granted in 2018. The Wize protocol is now open for free access and other uses such as the Internet of Things.

== Technical features ==
=== Channels ===
The radio spectrum of the EN13757-4 mode N standard defines 6 channels within the VHF band (5 up and 1 down). The combination of a low channel bandwidth (12.5 kHz), high speed option using 4GFSK modulation, bidirectionality and a high transmission power (500 mW, +27 dBm) enables the technology to achieve high radio performance.

=== Strong radio penetration ===
The communication standard is designed to connect IoT devices that are difficult to access (deep indoor).

=== Open source ===
no chip locking, no telecommunications locking for free development.

=== Range ===
Per unit, the in situ coverage of Wize technology varies from 50 km outdoors, 10 km indoors and 2.5 km deep indoors.

=== Battery lifetime ===
The small amount of communication per day (5 to 10) enables the power consumption to be very low. Small lithium batteries cells (AA, A or C) are enough to power the devices up to 20 years for remote meter reading.

=== End-to-end security ===
Highest end-to-end security standards guaranteed. The communication between devices and gateways (link layer) is end-to-end encrypted using hash keys in AES-128 to secure the data.

=== Over-the-air (OTA) updates ===
A protocol mechanism allows to schedule and perform, via broadcasting, an update of the devices' firmware over the air wirelessly.

== Roll outs ==
So far, more than 18 million smart meters are operated with the Wize protocol.

In France, GRDF took the decision in 2012 to develop gas meter solutions called Gazpar using Wize technology. The deployment of 11 million smart meters and ten thousand gateways started in 2016. It is mainly an energy efficiency project dedicated to clients and collectivities, designed to:

- Increase customer satisfaction through daily and automatic remote reading of gas consumption measures
- Develop energy savings by making consumption data available to clients.
- Optimize grid management and enhance performance of Distribution System Operators (DSOs), through more accurate knowledge of consumed volumes of gas.

By the end of October 2019, 4.5 million gas meters and 6,500 data-concentrators were installed in the field. GRDF intends to use its base infrastructure built on Wize technology for automatic and daily reading of industrial meters.

In 2018, the French local utility Régaz Bordeaux started a smart metering project with 250,000 gas meters.

The development of Wize 169 MHz infrastructures has also been undertaken in the water sector by the private utility Suez Eau France and other public water utilities such as Eau de Paris.

Smart water meters based on the Wize technology have also been deployed by other European utilities such as Aigües de Barcelona in Spain and Ovak in the Czech Republic and in countries such as the United-Kingdom, Malta, Portugal and Australia.

== Wize Alliance ==
Source: Founded by Suez, GRDF and Sagemcom in March 2017, the Wize Alliance, The Wize Alliance is a non-profit organization, aims to promote and develop the use of the 169 MHz Wize protocol. The Wize Alliance is presided by Samuel Loyson, Vice-President of Operations at SUEZ Digital Solutions. The board is constituted by the three founding members GRDF, Suez and Sagemcom.

Using the frequency 169 MHz is free by rights within the European Union, it is not mandatory to be part of the Wize Alliance to use the technology. All specifications have been published and can be downloaded for free from the Alliance Website.

Wize members include energy and water grid operators, transmission and distribution operators, equipment, semiconductor and battery manufacturers, information systems and complex industrial systems integrators, security experts, academics, wireless technology experts and start-ups. All of them are conducting researches or developing software or hardware solutions based on the 169 MHz protocol to secure information for IoT applications for cities, industrial or tertiary sectors.

Check Wize network coverage in France with its map.
