= Exosite (company) =

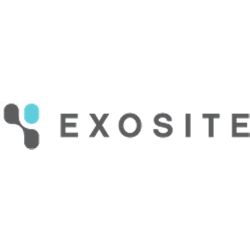
- Type: Private
- Industry: Internet of Things
- Founded: 2009
- Founder: Hans Rempel; Troy Kopischke; Danny Cunagin
- Headquarters: Minneapolis, Minnesota
- Services: Internet of Things software
- Website: exosite.com

Exosite is an Internet of Things (IoT) software as a service company that develops software for companies that view and analyze data collected from sensors built into physical objects. The company is headquartered in Minneapolis, Minnesota with an additional office in Taiwan.

Hans Rempel, Troy Kopischke and Danny Cunagin founded the company in 2009. Rempel serves as Exosite's chief executive officer. In 2012, the company held a $2 million series A funding round.

In 2014, the company partnered with Texas Instruments to offer its cloud-based IoT platform on Texas Instruments' LaunchPad series microcontrollers.

In May 2019, Exosite announced a collaboration with Sigfox, a global communications service provider, to launch Sigfox Service, an integration between the Sigfox backend and Exosite's Murano IoT software platform.
