= PJM =

PJM may refer to:

- Pacific Journal of Mathematics
- PixelJunk Monsters, a PlayStation Network game for the PlayStation 3
- Punjab Janata Morcha (Punjab Popular Front), a Sikh political party in the state of Punjab, India
- Polish Sign Language ("Polski Język Migowy")
- Puerto Jiménez Airport (IATA: PJM, ICAO: MRPJ) in Puerto Jiménez, Costa Rica
- PJM Interconnection, a regional transmission organization (RTO) in the eastern United States that operates one of the world's largest competitive wholesale electricity markets
- Phase Jitter Modulation, an RFID interface standard
- Pingat Jasa Malaysia, a Malaysian medal awarded to Commonwealth servicemen who served in Malaysia during the Malayan Emergency and the Malaysian-Indonesian Confrontation periods
- Patrick Joseph McGovern (1937-2014), a businessman, publisher, and entrepreneur known for founding Computerworld magazine, and founder of the McGovern Institute for Brain Research at MIT
- Park Jimin (Born 13 October 1995), South Korean singer and member of K-pop boy band BTS
- PJM, a hardy hybrid involving Rhododendron carolinianum, named after P.J. Mezitt.
- PJ Masks, a 2015 French animated television series:
  - The PJ Masks, titular protagonists of the series.
