= Low-power wide-area network =

Type of wireless telecommunication network

A low-power, wide-area network (LPWAN or LPWA network) is a type of wireless telecommunication wide area network designed to allow long-range communication at a low bit rate between IoT devices, such as sensors operated on a battery.

Low power, low bit rate, and intended use distinguish this type of network from a wireless WAN that is designed to connect users or businesses, and carry more data, using more power. The LPWAN data rate ranges from 0.3 kbit/s to 50 kbit/s per channel.

A LPWAN may be used to create a private wireless sensor network, but may also be a service or infrastructure offered by a third party, allowing the owners of sensors to deploy them in the field without investing in gateway technology.

== Attributes ==
1. Range: The operating range of LPWAN technology varies from a few kilometers in urban areas to over 10 km in rural settings. It can also enable effective data communication in previously infeasible indoor and underground locations.
2. Power: LPWAN manufacturers claim years to decades of usable life from built-in batteries, but real-world application tests have not confirmed this.

== Platforms and technologies ==
Some competing standards and vendors for LPWAN space include:

- DASH7, a low latency, bi-directional firmware standard that operates over multiple LPWAN radio technologies including LoRa.
- Wize is an open and royalty-free standard for LPWAN derived from the European Standard Wireless Mbus.
- Chirp spread spectrum (CSS) based devices.
- Sigfox, UNB-based technology and French company.
- LoRa is a proprietary, chirp spread spectrum radio modulation technology for LPWAN used by LoRaWAN, Haystack Technologies, and Symphony Link.
- mioty, implementing Telegram Splitting technology.
- Weightless is an open standard, narrowband technology for LPWAN used by Ubiik
- ELTRES, a LPWA technology developed by Sony, with transmission ranges of over 100 km while moving at speeds of 100 km/h.
- IEEE 802.11ah, also known as Wi-Fi HaLow, is a low-power, wide-area implementation of 802.11 wireless networking standard using sub-gig frequencies.

=== Ultra-narrow band ===
Ultra Narrowband (UNB), modulation technology used for LPWAN by various companies including:

- Sigfox, French UNB-based technology company.
- Weightless, a set of communication standards from the Weightless SIG.
- NB-Fi Protocol, developed by WAVIoT company.

=== Others ===
- DASH7 Mode 2 development framework for low power wireless networks, by Haystack Technologies. Runs over many wireless radio standards like LoRa, LTE, 802.15.4g, and others.
- LTE Advanced for Machine Type Communications (LTE-M), an evolution of LTE communications for connected things by 3GPP.
- MySensors, DIY Home Automation framework supporting different radios including LoRa.
- NarrowBand IoT (NB-IoT), standardization effort by 3GPP for a LPWAN used in cellular networks.
- Random phase multiple access (RPMA) from Ingenu, formerly known as On-Ramp Wireless, is based on a variation of CDMA technology for cellular phones, but uses unlicensed 2.4 GHz spectrum. RPMA is used in GE's AMI metering.
- Byron, a direct-sequence spread spectrum (DSSS) technology from Taggle Systems in Australia.
- Wi-SUN, based on IEEE 802.15.4g.

== See also ==
- Internet of things
- Wide area networks
- Static Context Header Compression (SCHC)
- QRP operation
- Slowfeld
- Through-the-earth mine communications
- Short range device
- IEEE 802.15.4 (Low-power personal-area network)
- IEEE 802.16 (WiMAX)
