= ANT (network) =

Canadian multicast wireless sensor network technology

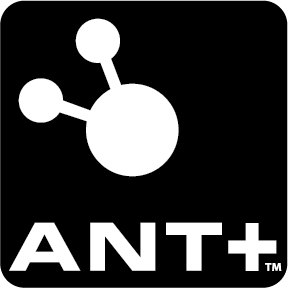
- Developed by: ANT Wireless
- Introduced: 2003
- Industry: Wireless Sensor Networks
- Physical range: 100 m
- Website: www.thisisant.com

ANT (originates from Adaptive Network Topology) is a proprietary (but open access) multicast wireless sensor network technology designed and marketed by ANT Wireless (a division of Garmin Canada). It provides personal area networks (PANs), primarily for activity trackers. ANT was introduced by Dynastream Innovations in 2003, followed by the low-power standard ANT+ in 2004, before Dynastream was bought by Garmin in 2006.

ANT defines a wireless communications protocol stack that enables hardware operating in the 2.4 GHz ISM band to communicate by establishing standard rules for co-existence, data representation, signalling, authentication, and error detection. It is conceptually similar to Bluetooth low energy (BLE), but is oriented towards use with sensors.

As of November 2020, the ANT website lists almost 200 brands using ANT technology. Samsung and, to a lesser part, Fujitsu, HTC, Kyocera, Nokia and Sharp added native support (without the use of a USB adapter) to their smartphones, with Samsung starting support with the Galaxy S4 and ending support with the Galaxy S20 line.

In 2025, Garmin announced that they would end their certification for ANT+ devices, blaming changes in wireless communication regulations. This is likely to lead to future devices dropping ANT+ support in favour of BLE.

== Overview ==
ANT-powered nodes are capable of acting as sources or sinks within a wireless sensor network concurrently. This means the nodes can act as transmitters, receivers, or transceivers to route traffic to other nodes. In addition, every node is capable of determining when to transmit based on the activity of its neighbors.

== Technical information ==
ANT can be configured to spend long periods in a low-power sleep mode (drawing current on the order of microamperes), wake up briefly to communicate (when current rises to a peak of 22 milliamperes (at −5 dB) during reception and 13.5 milliamperes (at −5 dB) during transmission) and return to sleep mode. Average current draw for low message rates is less than 60 microamperes on the nRF24AP1 chip. The newer nRF24AP2 has improved on these figures.

ANT is considered a network/transport layer protocol. The underlying link layer protocol is Shockburst, which is used in many other Nordic Semiconductor "NRF" chips such as those used with Arduino. ANT uses Shockburst at 1 Mbit/s with GFSK modulation, translating to a 1 MHz bandwidth, resulting in 126 available radio channels over the ISM band.

ANT channels are separate from the underlying Shockburst RF channels. They are identified simply by a channel number built into the packet, and on the nRF24AP2 78 channels can be used. Each ANT channel consists of one or more transmitting nodes and one or more receiving nodes, depending on the network topology. Any node can transmit or receive, so the channels are bi-directional. Newer versions of ANT can back one ANT channel with several RF channels through frequency agility.

The underlying RF channel is only half-duplex, meaning only one node can transmit at a time. The underlying radio chip can also only choose to transmit or receive at any given moment. As a result, the ANF channel is controlled by a Time Division Multiple Access scheme. A "master" node controls the timing, while the "slave" nodes use the master node's transmission to determine when they can transmit.

ANT accommodates three types of messaging: broadcast, acknowledged, and burst.

- Broadcast is a one-way communication from one node to another (or many). The "master" transmits one packet periodically. The receiving node(s) transmit no acknowledgment, but the receiving node may still send messages back to the transmitting node by using the "master"'s transmission as a source of timing. This technique is suited to sensor applications and is the most economical method of operation.
- Acknowledged messaging confirms receipt of data packets. The "master" transmits one packet periodically. The "slave", should it receive the message successfully, sends back an indication of success with the possibility of attaching more messages. There are no automatic retransmissions. This technique is suited to control applications.
- Burst messaging sends multiple packets in a row. The transmitter sends several packets in a row with an interval much shorter than the usual channel period, extending the usual time slot. Each packet has a sequence number in the range 0–7. The receiving node acknowledges receipt for each packet, and the "master" retries for up to 5 times for each packet. Only when one packet is successfully received is the next sent. Burst mode achieves a payload data rate of 20 kbit/s. Both the "master" and "slave" can send a burst.
- Advanced burst is similar to burst messaging, but has features such as more retries and "stall packets" to keep the burst alive for longer.

== Comparison to other protocols ==
ANT was designed for low-bit-rate and low-power sensor networks, in a manner conceptually similar to (but not compatible with) Bluetooth Low Energy. This is in contrast with normal Bluetooth, which was designed for relatively high-bit-rate applications such as streaming sound for low-power headsets.

ANT uses adaptive isochronous transmission to allow many ANT devices to communicate concurrently without interference from one another, unlike Bluetooth LE, which supports an unlimited number of nodes through scatternets and broadcasting between devices.

	ANT	Z-Wave	Bluetooth	Bluetooth LE	Zigbee
Standardisation	Proprietary	Proprietary	Standard	Standard	Standard
Topologies	Point-to-point, star, tree, mesh	Mesh	Point-to-point, scatternet	Point-to-point, star, mesh	Mesh
Band	2.4 GHz	2.4 GHz and 900 MHz (varies slightly per country)	2.4 GHz	2.4 GHz	2.4 GHz (+ sub-GHz for Zigbee PRO)
Range	30 metres at 0 dBm	10–100 metres	1–100 metres	10–600 metres in air (Bluetooth 5)	10–100 metres
Max data rate	Broadcast/Ack – 200 Hz × 8 bytes × 8 bits = 12.8 kbit/s Burst – 20 kbit/s Advanced Burst – 60 kbit/s	100 kbit/s	1–3 Mbit/s	125 kbit/s, 250 kbit/s, 500 kbit/s, 1 Mbit/s, 2 Mbit/s (Bluetooth 5 PHY speeds)	250 kbit/s (at 2.4 GHz)
Application throughput	0.5 Hz to 200 Hz (8 bytes data)		0.7–2.1 Mbit/s	305 kbit/s (Bluetooth 4.0)	
Max nodes in piconet	65533 per shared channel (8 shared channels)	232 devices per network	1 sink and 7 active sensors, >200 inactive	1 sink and 7 sensors (but scatternet unlimited), mesh – 32767	star – 65536
Security	AES-128 and 64-bit key	AES-128	56–128-bit key	AES-128	AES-128
Modulation	GFSK	FSK	GFSK	GFSK	OQPSK

== Interference immunity ==
Bluetooth, Wi-Fi, and Zigbee employ direct-sequence spread spectrum (DSSS) and Frequency-hopping spread spectrum (FHSS) schemes respectively to maintain the integrity of the wireless link.

ANT uses an adaptive isochronous network technology to ensure coexistence with other ANT devices. This scheme provides the ability for each transmission to occur in an interference-free time slot within the defined frequency band. The radio transmits for less than 150 μs per message, allowing a single channel to be divided into hundreds of time slots. The ANT messaging period (the time between each node transmitting its data) determines how many time slots are available.

== ANT+ ==
ANT+, introduced in 2004 as "the first ultra low power wireless standard", is an interoperability function that can be added to the base ANT protocol. This standardization allows the networking of nearby ANT+ devices to facilitate the open collection and interpretation of sensor data. For example, ANT+ enabled fitness monitoring devices such as heart-rate monitors, pedometers, speed monitors, and weight scales can all work together to assemble and track performance metrics.

ANT+ is designed and maintained by the ANT+ Alliance, which is managed by ANT Wireless, a division of Dynastream Innovations, owned by Garmin. ANT+ is used in Garmin's line of fitness monitoring equipment. It is also used by Garmin's Chirp, a geocaching device, for logging and alerting nearby participants.

Until 2025, ANT+ devices required certification from the ANT+ Alliance to ensure compliance with standard device profiles. Each device profile has an icon which may be used to visually match interoperable devices sharing the same device profiles.

The ANT+ specification is publicly available. At DEF CON 2019, hacker Brad Dixon demonstrated a tool to modify ANT+ data transmitted through USB for cheating in virtual cycling.

== See also ==
- LoRa
- Wi-Fi
- Wireless USB
