= Ingenu =

Provider of wireless networks

- Type: Private
- Industry: Machine to Machine, Internet of Things, Wireless
- Founded: 2008
- Founders: Ted Myers, Rob Boesel, Joaquin Silva
- Headquarters: San Diego, United States
- Number of employees: 0-1
- Website: www.ingenu.com

Ingenu, formerly known as On-Ramp Wireless, is a provider of wireless networks. The company focuses on machine to machine (M2M) communication by enabling devices to become Internet of Things (IoT) devices.

== History ==
Ingenu was founded in 2008 as On-Ramp Wireless; by the end of 2014, it was valued at $72 million, according to data from PitchBook.

On September 1, 2010, the World Economic Forum announced the company as a Technology Pioneer for 2011.

On April 4, 2011, Bloomberg announced the company as a 2011 New Energy Pioneer.

The company was renamed to Ingenu in September 2015. Initially, the company focused on utilities, but in 2012 expanded to the gas and oil industries. The Ingenu brand launch in September 2015 coincided with the announcement of a network dedicated to machine connectivity.

== Technology ==
Using the free 2.4 GHz ISM bands, Ingenu’s hardware has been tested at over a 30-mile range in the 2.4 GHz free ISM band while maintaining low power operation. It is optimized for robustness, range and capacity.

As of September 2015 the company had operations in 20 countries.

== Technology ==
Ingenu uses the name random phase multiple access (RPMA) for patented technology used in its network. RPMA is used in GE's AMI metering. RPMA is also used for oil and gas field automation, or digital oilfield. The technology includes network appliances, the microNode radio module, a reference Application Communication Module for development platform, and a general I/O device.

=== The Machine Network ===
In September 2015, Ingenu announced a public network exclusively for machines supported by RPMA technology. The network will begin in the US, and as of the launch had 55,000 square miles. The company planned to cover Phoenix and Dallas by the end of 2015 with coverage across the United States complete by the end of 2017. The Machine Network also has coverage in Europe, starting with nationwide coverage of Italy, through a partnership with Meterlinq.

Ingenu has private, regional, machine-to-machine networks. One of these networks is owned by San Diego Gas & Electric. At the announcement of the Machine Network, Ingenu indicated it would continue to support and pursue private networks.
