= Supply network operations =

Supply network operations or supply chain operations involve the synchronized execution of compliant manufacturing and logistics processes across a dynamically reconfigurable supply network to profitably meet demand.
