= Phase-jitter modulation =

Phase-jitter modulation (PJM) is a modulation method specifically designed to meet the unique requirements of passive RFID tags. It has been adopted by the high-frequency RFID Air Interface Standard ISO/IEC 18000-3 MODE 2 for high-speed bulk conveyor-fed item-level identification because of its demonstrably higher data rates. The MODE 2 PJM data rate is 423,75 kbit/s; 16 times faster than the alternative MODE 1 system ISO/IEC 18000-3 MODE 1 and the legacy HF system ISO/IEC 15693.

== Method ==
PJM works by representing data as very small phase changes in the instantaneous phase of a carrier signal. PJM can be regarded as a very low-level phase-modulation (PM) signal where amplitude-modulation (AM) components are suppressed to provide a constant-modulus signal. Most of the power (greater than 99%) in a PJM signal is transmitted as an un-modulated carrier and conveys no information. Less than 1% of the transmitted power is used for conveying the modulated data.

Passive RFID tags have no internal power source and derive their power from an external power source, typically the interrogating signal generated by an RFID interrogator. The interrogation signal is required to both power and communicate with the RFID tag. For a PJM signal the un-modulated carrier component powers the passive tag and the low-level modulated component conveys data to the tag. The tag uses the un-modulated carrier signal as a phase reference for demodulating the data signal. There is no reduction in the transfer of power to the tag during PJM.

There are international and US regulations that restrict the spectrum of the transmitted interrogation signal used by any RFID system. These regulations mandate a spectral mask that restricts both the frequency and amplitude of the interrogation signal. For a PJM signal the powering signal and the modulated data signal components are decoupled allowing the spectrum of the PJM signal to be matched to the spectral mask defined under these regulations by suitable amplitude adjustment of the un-modulated carrier and encoding and/or filtering of the modulated data signal.

== Applications ==
Primary applications are in RFID tags for use in gaming, healthcare, pharmaceuticals, document and media management.
