= NB-Fi =

NB-Fi Protocol is an open LPWAN protocol, which operates in unlicensed ISM radio band. Using the NB-Fi Protocol in devices allows data transmission range of up to 10 km in dense urban conditions, and up to 30 km in rural areas with up to 10 years on battery power.

NB-Fi Protocol is developed by WAVIoT.

== Technology ==
NB-Fi Protocol employs a Narrow Band technology that enables communication using the Industrial, Scientific and Medical ISM radio band (and in other parts of sub-GHz license-free spectrum as well).

NB-Fi devices could be manufactured using widespread electronic components which could easily be manufactured or purchased in every particular country. WAVIoT has developed an NB-Fi transceiver that encapsulates the NB-Fi protocol at a physical layer.

The NB-Fi transceiver supports 430–500 MHz and 860–925 MHz frequency bands at 50 to 25,600 bit/s data rates.

The network is based on one-hop star topology and requires a SDR-technology base stations to operate. The signal can also be used to easily cover large areas and to reach underground objects.

== Implementation ==
NB-Fi Protocol stack is currently implemented on:

- STM32L0x/STM32L4x Series microcontrollers (manufacturer: STMicroelectronics) with NB-Fi transceiver (manufacturer: WAVIoT) or AX5043 transceiver (manufacturer: ON Semiconductor);
- AX8052F143 with AX8052 MCU and AX5043 RF transceiver (manufacturer: ON Semiconductor).
