= Savi Technology =

Savi Technology, Inc.
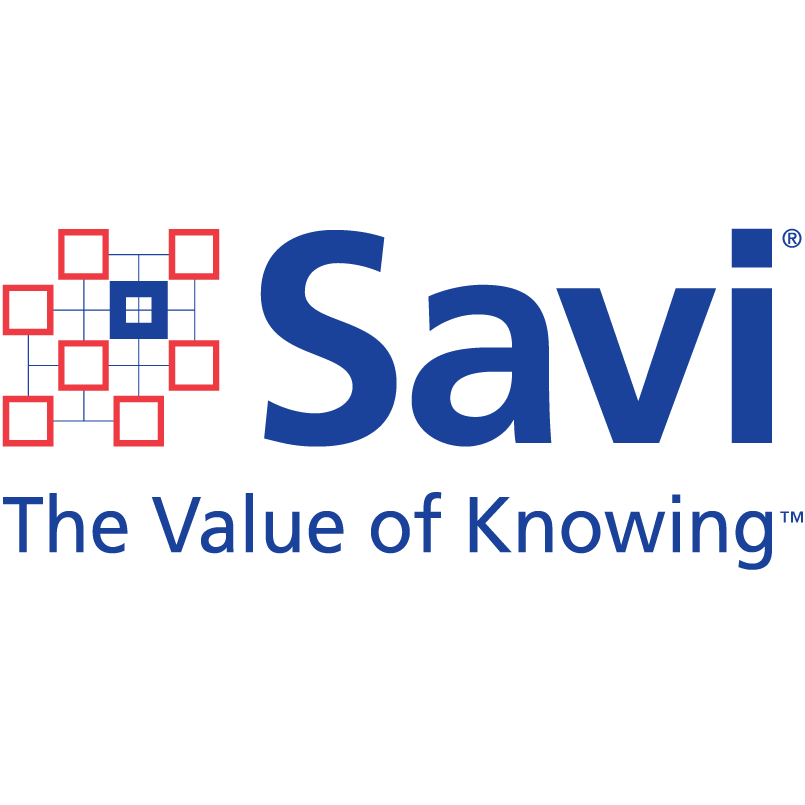
- Founded: 1989 in Alexandria, Virginia, Virginia, United States
- Headquarters: United States
- Area served: Worldwide
- Key people: William Clark (President and CEO); Brian Daum (Senior Vice President and CFO); Andy Souders (Senior Vice President, Products and Strategy)
- Website: www.savi.com

Savi Technology was founded in 1989 and is based in Alexandria, Virginia.

The company was spun-off from Lockheed Martin in 2012.

The company offers a variety of hardware including tags (also called sensors) that enable governments and organizations to access real-time information on the location, condition, and security status of assets and shipments; mobile IoT sensors, fixed and mobile readers; active radio-frequency identification devices and sensors; and portable deployment kits (PDKs).
