= 2.4 GHz radio use =

Uses of the 2.4 GHz ISM radio spectrum

There are several uses of the 2.4 GHz ISM radio band. Interference may occur between devices operating at 2.4 GHz. This article details the different users of the 2.4 GHz band, how they cause interference to other users and how they are prone to interference from other users.

== Phone ==
Many of the cordless telephones and baby monitors in the United States and Canada use the 2.4 GHz frequency, the same frequency at which Wi-Fi standards 802.11b, 802.11g, 802.11n and 802.11ax operate. This can cause a significant decrease in speed, or sometimes the total blocking of the Wi-Fi signal when a conversation on the phone takes place.

== Bluetooth ==
Bluetooth devices intended for use in short-range personal area networks operate from 2.4 to 2.4835 GHz. To reduce interference with other protocols that use the 2.45 GHz band, the Bluetooth protocol divides the band into 80 channels (numbered from 0 to 79, each 1 MHz wide. Bluetooth Low Energy has half the number of channels, with each channel twice as wide as Bluetooth Classic), and changes channels up to 1600 times per second. Bluetooth also features Adaptive Frequency Hopping which attempts to detect existing signals in the ISM band, such as Wi-Fi channels, and avoid them by negotiating a channel map between the communicating Bluetooth devices.

The USB 3.0 computer cable standard has been proven to generate significant amounts of electromagnetic interference that can interfere with any Bluetooth devices a user has connected to the same computer.

== Wi-Fi ==
Wi-Fi is technology for radio wireless local area networking of devices based on the IEEE 802.11 standards. Wi‑Fi is a trademark of the Wi-Fi Alliance, which restricts the use of the term Wi-Fi Certified to products that successfully complete interoperability certification testing.

Devices that can use Wi-Fi technologies include desktops and laptops, video game consoles, smartphones and tablets, smart TVs, digital audio players, cars and modern printers. Wi-Fi compatible devices can connect to the Internet via a WLAN and a wireless access point. Such an access point (or hotspot) has a range of about 20 meters (66 feet) indoors and a greater range outdoors. Hotspot coverage can be as small as a single room with walls that block radio waves, or as large as many square kilometres achieved by using multiple overlapping access points.

Different versions of Wi-Fi exist, with different ranges, radio bands and speeds. Wi-Fi most commonly uses the 2.4 gigahertz (12 cm) UHF and 5.8 gigahertz (5 cm) SHF ISM radio bands; these bands are subdivided into multiple channels. Each channel can be time-shared by multiple networks. These wavelengths work best for line-of-sight. Many common materials absorb or reflect them, which further restricts range, but can tend to help minimise interference between different networks in crowded environments. At close range, some versions of Wi-Fi, running on suitable hardware, can achieve speeds of over 1 Gbit/s.

Anyone within range with a wireless network interface controller can attempt to access a network; because of this, Wi-Fi is more vulnerable to attack (called eavesdropping) than wired networks. Wi-Fi Protected Access (WPA) is a family of technologies created to protect information moving across Wi-Fi networks and includes solutions for personal and enterprise networks. Security features of WPA have included stronger protections and new security practices as the security landscape has changed over time.

To guarantee no interference in any circumstances, the Wi-Fi protocol requires 16.25 (11g/n) or 22 MHz (11b) of channel separation (as shown below). Any remaining gap is used as a guard band to allow sufficient attenuation along the edge channels. This guardband is mainly used to accommodate older routers with modem chipsets prone to full channel occupancy, as most modern Wi-Fi modems are not prone to excessive channel occupancy.

Graphical representation of overlapping 22 MHz channels within the 2.4 GHz band

While overlapping frequencies can be configured and will usually work, it can cause interference, resulting in slowdowns, sometimes severe, particularly in heavy use. Certain subsets of frequencies can be used simultaneously at any one location without interference (see diagrams for typical allocations):

Graphical representation of Wireless LAN channels in 2.4 GHz band. Channels 12 and 13 are customarily unused in North America. As a result, the usual 20 MHz allocation becomes 1/6/11, the same as 11b. Note "channel 3" in the 40 MHz diagram above is often labelled with the 20 MHz channel numbers "1+5" or "1" with "+ Upper" or "5" with "+ Lower" in router interfaces, and "11" as "9+13" or "9" with "+ Upper" or "13" with "+ Lower".

However, the exact spacing required when the transmitters are not colocated depends on the protocol, the data rate selected, the distances and the electromagnetic environment where the equipment is used.

Attenuation by channel spacing for 20 MHz (OFDM) transmitters
Channel separation:	0	1	2	3	4	5
Attenuation (dB)	0	0.3–0.6	1.8–2.5	6.6–8.2	23.5–35	49.9–53.2
See also, page 8, for the DSSS spectral mask.

The attenuation by relative channel adds to that due to distance and the effects of obstacles. Per the standards, for transmitters on the same channel, transmitters must take turns to transmit if they can detect each other 3 dB above the noise floor (the thermal noise floor is around -101 dBm for 20 MHz channels). On the other hand, transmitters will ignore transmitters on other channels if the attenuated signal strength from them is below a threshold P_{th} which, for non Wi-Fi 6 systems, is between -76 and -80 dBm. While there can be interference (bit errors) at a receiver, this is usually small if the received signal is more than 20 dB above the attenuated signal strength from transmitters on the other channels.

The overall effect is that if there is considerable overlap between adjacent channel transmitters, they will often interfere with each other. In general, using every fourth or fifth channel by leaving three or four channels clear between used channels causes much less interference than sharing channels, and narrower spacing still can be used at further distances.

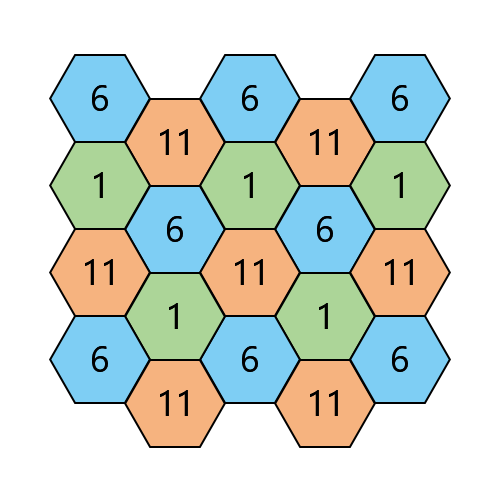
Minimal network layout in the United States, providing coverage of an area using three channels

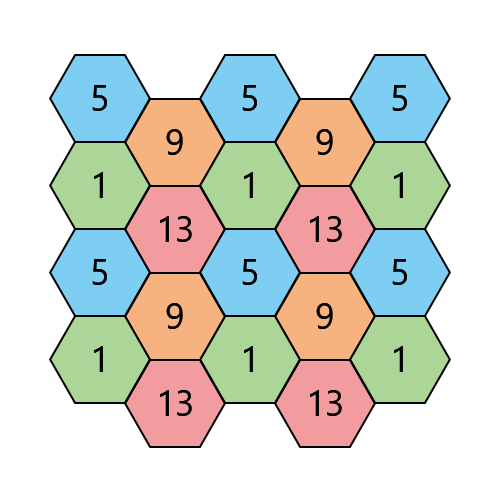
European Wi-Fi channel availability permits square frequency reuse patterns

== Zigbee/IEEE 802.15.4 wireless data networks ==
Many Zigbee/IEEE 802.15.4-based wireless data networks operate in the 2.4–2.4835 GHz band, and so are subject to interference from other devices operating in that same band. The definition is for 16 channels numbered 11–26 to occupy the space, each 2 MHz wide and spaced by 5 MHz. The F_{0} of channel 11 is set at 2.405 GHz. The DSSS scheme is used to spread out the spectrum (from a data-rate of 250 kbit/s) and reduce interference.

To avoid interference from IEEE 802.11 networks, an IEEE 802.15.4 network can be configured to only use channels 15, 20, 25, and 26, avoiding frequencies used by the commonly used IEEE 802.11 channels 1, 6, and 11. The exact channel selection depends on the local popular 802.11 channel. For example, in a place that uses 1, 7, and 13 channels, the preference would be for channels 15, 16, 21, and 22. Channel coexistence is possible provided 8 meters of spacing between the 802.11 access point and the 802.15.4 device.

== RF peripherals ==
Some wireless peripherals like keyboards and mice use the 2.4 GHz band with a proprietary protocol.

== Amateur radio ==
Amateur radio operators in the US are able to operate from 2300 to 2450 MHz, except for 2310 to 2390 MHz. The frequencies between 2400 and 2410 MHz are reserved in the United States for amateur satellite communications, and 2410 to 2450 MHz for broadband activities. Amateur radio operators are permitted up to 1500 watts of power and 22 MHz of bandwidth in the 2400 MHz band. Various portions of the 2400 MHz band are available to amateur radio operators in many other countries.

== Microwave oven ==
Most domestic microwave ovens operate by emitting a very high power signal in the 2.4 GHz band. Older devices have poor shielding, and often emit a very "dirty" signal over the entire 2.4 GHz band. (Note: Large industrial or commercial ovens typically use a longer-wave ISM frequency near 915 MHz.)

This can cause considerable difficulties to Wi-Fi and video transmission, resulting in reduced range or complete blocking of the signal.

The IEEE 802.11 committee that developed the Wi-Fi specification conducted an extensive investigation into the interference potential of microwave ovens. A typical microwave oven uses a self-oscillating vacuum power tube called a magnetron and a high voltage power supply with a half wave rectifier (often with voltage doubling) and no DC filtering. This produces an RF pulse train with a duty cycle below 50% as the tube is completely off for half of every AC mains cycle: 8.33 ms in 60 Hz countries and 10 ms in 50 Hz countries.

This property gave rise to a Wi-Fi microwave oven interference robustness mode that segments larger data frames into fragments, each small enough to fit into the oven's off periods.

The 802.11 committee also found that although the instantaneous frequency of a microwave oven magnetron varies widely over each half AC cycle with the instantaneous supply voltage, at any instant it is relatively coherent, i.e., it occupies only a narrow bandwidth. The 802.11a/g signal is inherently robust against such interference because it uses OFDM with error correction information interleaved across the carriers; as long as only a few carriers are wiped out by strong narrow band interference, the information in them can be regenerated by the error correcting code from the carriers that do get through.

== Audio-visual (AV) devices ==
=== Baby monitors ===
Some baby monitors use the 2.4 GHz band. Some transmit only audio, but others also provide video.

=== Audio devices ===
==== Wireless microphones ====
Wireless microphones operate as transmitters. Some digital wireless microphones use the 2.4 GHz band (e.g., AKG model DPT 70).

==== Wireless speakers ====
Wireless speakers operate as receivers. The transmitter is a preamplifier that may be integrated in another device. Some wireless speakers use the 2.4 GHz band, with a proprietary protocol. They may be subject to dropouts caused by interference from other devices.

=== Video devices ===
Video senders typically operate using an FM carrier to carry a video signal from one room to another (for example, satellite TV or closed-circuit television). These devices typically operate continuously but have low (10 mW) transmit power. However, some devices, especially wireless cameras, operate with (often unauthorized) high power levels, and have high-gain antennas.

Amateur radio operators can transmit two-way amateur television (and voice) in the 2.4 GHz band—and all ISM frequencies above 902 MHz—with maximum power of 1500 watts in the US if the transmission mode does not include spread spectrum techniques. Other power levels apply per regions. In the UK, the maximum power level for a full licence is 400 watts. In other countries, maximum power level for non-spread-spectrum emissions are set by local legislation.

Although the transmitter of some video cameras appears to be fixed on one frequency, it has been found in several models that the cameras are actually frequency agile, and can have their frequency changed by disassembling the product and moving solder links or DIP switches inside the camera.

These devices are prone to interference from other 2.4 GHz devices, due to the nature of an analog video signal showing up interference very easily. A carrier-to-noise ratio of some 20 dB is required to give a "clean" picture.

Continuous transmissions interfere with these, causing "patterning" on the picture, sometimes a dark or light shift, or complete blocking of the signal.

Non-continuous transmissions, such as Wi-Fi, cause horizontal noise bars to appear on the screen, and can cause "popping" or "clicking" to be heard in the audio.

==== Wi-Fi networks ====
Video senders are a big problem for Wi-Fi networks: Unlike intermittent Wi-Fi, they operate continuously and are typically only 10 MHz in bandwidth. This causes a very intense signal as viewed on a spectrum analyser, and completely obliterates over half a channel. The result of this, typically in a Wireless Internet service provider-type environment, is that clients (who cannot hear the video sender due to the "hidden node" effect) can hear the Wi-Fi without any issues, but the receiver on the WISP's access point is completely obliterated by the video sender, so is extremely deaf. Furthermore, due to the nature of video senders, they are not interfered with by Wi-Fi easily, since the receiver and transmitter are typically located very close together, so the capture effect is very high. Wi-Fi also has a very wide spectrum, so only typically 30% of the peak power of the Wi-Fi actually affects the video sender. Wi-Fi is not a continuous transmission, so the Wi-Fi signal interferes only intermittently with the video sender. A combination of these factors - low power output of the Wi-Fi compared to the video sender, the fact that typically the video sender is far closer to the receiver than the Wi-Fi transmitter and the FM capture effect means that a video sender may cause problems to Wi-Fi over a wide area, but the Wi-Fi unit causes few problems to the video sender.

==== Effective isotropic radiated power (EIRP) ====
Many video senders on the market in the UK advertise a 100 mW equivalent isotropically radiated power (EIRP). However, the UK market only permits a 10 mW EIRP limit. These devices cause far more interference across a far wider area, due to their excessive power. Furthermore, UK video senders are required to operate across a 20 MHz bandwidth (not to be confused with 20 MHz deviation).

This more widely spread our and stronger power means that some foreign imported video senders are not legal, since they operate on a 15 MHz bandwidth or lower, which causes a higher spectral power density, increasing the interference. Furthermore, most other countries permit 100 mW EIRP for video senders, meaning a lot of video senders in the UK have excessive power outputs.

== Radio control ==
=== Radio-controlled models ===
Many radio-controlled drones, model aircraft, model boats and toys use the 2.4 GHz band. These radio systems can go up to 500 meters in radio-controlled cars and over 2.5 kilometres (1.6 mi) in drones and airplanes.

=== Garage doors ===
Some garage door openers use the 2.4 GHz band.

== Car alarm ==
Certain car manufacturers use the 2.4 GHz frequency for their car alarm internal movement sensors. These devices transmit on 2.45 GHz (between channels 8 and 9) at a strength of 500 mW. Because of channel overlap, this will cause problems for channels 6 and 11, which are commonly used default channels for Wi-Fi connections. Because the signal is transmitted as a continuous tone, it causes particular problems for Wi-Fi traffic. This can be clearly seen with spectrum analysers. These devices, due to their short range and high power, are typically not susceptible to interference from other devices on the 2.4 GHz band.

== Radars ==
Some radars use the 2.4 GHz band.

== Power ==
=== Smart power meters ===
Some 'smart' power meters use the 2.4 GHz band.

=== Wireless power ===
Some wireless power transmission uses the 2.4 GHz band.

== USB 3.0 ==
USB 3.0 devices and cables, if not shielded properly, may introduce noise to the 2.4 GHz band.

== See also ==
- Electromagnetic interference
- List of WLAN channels
