= Ultra Narrowband =

In communication engineering, Ultra NarrowBand (UNB) systems are those in which the channel has a very narrow bandwidth.

== Technical characteristics ==
An ultra narrowband receiver is highly selective and can reject noise and interference which may enter the receiver outside its narrow bandwidth, enabling an acceptable signal-to-noise ratio to be achieved with a relatively weak received signal. Consequently, transmitter power levels can be low and the effective range of transmissions may be greater than would typically be the case for technologies which do not provide such selectivity. Some other radio technologies, such as direct sequence spread spectrum and chirp spread spectrum, employ alternative approaches to selectively extract signals from interference and noise. Typical UNB systems operate with a bandwidth of a few 10s to a few 100s Hz and are used for the transmission and reception of digital signals.

The use of highly selective filters in UNB receivers can provide very effective rejection of UNB signals from other UNB devices on adjacent carrier frequencies, permitting the operation of many devices in a limited geographical area.

== UNB LPWAN ==
UNB technology is often used where links from very high numbers of devices are needed, with relatively small amounts of data being exchanged on each link. Some such applications can be found in the Internet of things, with UNB being one of the technologies that have been used to implement Low-Power Wide Area Networks. Short, infrequent transmissions with low transmit power can enable long-life, battery-powered operation of UNB devices connected in a LPWAN.

UNB LPWAN often operate on VHF or UHF frequencies where radio signal propagation characteristics are suited to typical UNB applications with ranges of 10 km or greater. They may be deployed in a shared spectrum (ISM band)

Typical properties of UNB devices operating in the UHF spectrum below 1 GHz have been described by ETSI; whilst specific UNB-based protocols for the implementation of LPWAN have also been standardised (alongside others) by ETSI.
