= MulteFire =

Extension of LTE technology into unlicensed bands

MulteFire is an LTE-based technology that operates standalone in unlicensed and shared spectrum, including the global 5 GHz band. Based on 3GPP Release 13 and 14, MulteFire technology supports "listen-before-talk "for co-existence with Wi-Fi and other technologies operating in the same spectrum. It supports private LTE and neutral host deployment models. Target vertical markets include industrial IoT, enterprise, cable, and various other vertical markets.

The MulteFire Release 1.0 specification was developed by the MulteFire Alliance, an industry consortium promoting it. Release 1.0 was published to MulteFire Alliance members in January 2017 and was made publicly available in April 2017. The MulteFire Alliance is currently working on Release 1.1 which will add further optimizations for IoT and new spectrum bands.

The MulteFire Alliance grew to more than 40 members in 2018. Its board members include Boingo Wireless, CableLabs, Ericsson, Huawei, Intel, Nokia, Qualcomm and SoftBank Group.

== See also ==
- LTE in unlicensed spectrum
