= ERMES =

ERMES (European Radio Messaging System or Enhanced Radio Messaging System) was a pan-European radio paging system.

== Technical specification ==
In 1990, the European Telecommunications Standard Institute (ETSI) developed the European Telecommunications Standard ETS 300 133 for ERMES operating in the frequency band 169.4125-169.8125 MHz.

=== Transmission parameters ===
- ERMES transmits the data at 6250 bit/s.
- ERMES uses Frequency Shift Keying (4-FSK) modulation.

=== Transmission parameters, pager interrogation ===
- Each paging transmission is divided into 60 cycles of 1 minute in length.
- Each cycle is divided into 5 subsequences of 12 seconds.
- Each subsequence is further divided into 16 batches, labeled A through P.

=== Pager interrogation ===
- The pager population is divided into 16 groups.
- Each pager group is allocated to one of the 16 transmission batches [A...P].
- The pager needs only to be active during the period it has been allocated to, allowing it to go into sleep mode 15/16 (~=93%) of the time (a ~7% duty cycle). This scheduling allocation protocol extends the battery life of the pager by several orders of magnitude.

== Aims and development ==
During the 1990s, ERMES aimed to achieve a standardised digital platform throughout Europe. It was intended that paging systems based on the ERMES standard would be able to receive text messages transmitted from personal computers, enabling companies to contact their employees over the PSTN. Also, GSM handsets would receive ERMES messages on their displays.

ERMES was most widely used in France, where around one million ERMES pagers were in use in 1998. Also in 1998, an ERMES MoU organisation was set up, to lobby for its adoption as the European standard.

== Failure ==
ERMES never achieved recognition as a leading paging standard. There were questions over costs and also the ERMES standard was in competition with the US-based FLEX standard, a rivalry seen at the time as damaging to the development of the paging industry in Europe. Ultimately paging technology was largely superseded by SMS text messaging.

In 1999, it was decided that the 169.4-169.8 MHz frequency band would no longer be reserved for the sole use of ERMES and this frequency band was later reassigned to different use.
