= Sigfox =

French wireless networking company

Sigfox S.A.
- Native name: Sigfox 0G technology
- Formerly: Sigfox
- Type: Société Anonyme
- Industry: Wireless services
- Founded: 2010
- Founders: Ludovic Le Moan and Christophe Fourtet
- Headquarters: Singapore
- Area served: Global
- Key people: Henri Bong, Philippe Chiu, Davy Lassagne, Rémi François, Nicolas Chalbos, Julien Couret
- Services: IoT
- Number of employees: 150
- Website: www.sigfox.com

Sigfox 0G technology is a global Low-Power Wide-Area (LPWA) networking protocol founded in 2010 and adopted by 70+ Sigfox 0G Network Operators globally. This wireless network was designed to connect low-power objects such as electricity meters securely, at low-cost, emitting small amounts of data.

Sigfox is based in Labège near Toulouse, France, and once had over 375 employees in Madrid, San Francisco, Sydney and Paris.

The former Sigfox entity had raised more than $300 million from investors that included Salesforce, Intel, Samsung, NTT, SK Telecom, energy groups Total and Air Liquide. In November 2016 Sigfox was valued at around €600 million. In January 2022 it filed for bankruptcy.

In April 2022 Singapore-based IoT company UnaBiz acquired the Sigfox 0G technology and its French network operations for a reported €25 million ($27m).

As of December 2024, the Sigfox 0G network managed by UnaBiz supports over 14 million active connected devices worldwide. Following the acquisition, national operators that owned their own infrastructure continued service independently. In Mexico, the network operator reported processing over 8 million messages daily from more than 500,000 endpoints without service interruption during or after the insolvency process.

== Technology ==
Sigfox employs differential binary phase-shift keying (DBPSK) and Gaussian frequency shift keying (GFSK) over the Short-range device band of 868 MHz in Europe, and the Industrial, Scientific and Medical radio band of 902 MHz in the US. It utilizes a wide-reaching signal that passes freely through solid objects, called "Ultra Narrowband" and requires little energy, being termed a "low-power wide-area network" (LPWAN). The network is based on one-hop star topology. The signal can also be used to easily cover large areas and to reach underground objects. As of December 2024, the Sigfox 0G global network has covered a total of 5.8 million square kilometers in a total of 75 countries with 1.3 billion of the world population reached.

The Sigfox 0G technology is supported by a number of firms in the LPWAN industry such as NXP Semiconductors, Holtek, ST Microelectronics, Semtech and Silicon Labs. The ISM radio bands support limited bidirectional communication. The existing standard for Sigfox communications supports up to 140 uplink messages a day, each of which can carry a payload of 12 octets (Byte) at a data rate of up to 100 bits per second, and/or 600bit/s in some regions.

Upon acquisition, UnaBiz released the Sigfox device library code for connected objects to the public and IoT development community to drive technology interoperability and the unification of LPWANs in the IoT industry. The developer community can now visit the 0G technology's Github page and Build to access the new device library codes and related documentation.

== Coverage ==
- Map of coverage and countries under roll-out

Global coverage of Sigfox network
Continent	Country or Territory	Provider
Africa	Kenya	Liquid Telecom
Africa	Mauritius	io connect
Africa	Mayotte	io connect
Africa	Réunion	io connect
Africa	South Africa	Sigfox South Africa
Africa	Tunisia	IoT Tunisia
Asia	Hong Kong	Thinxtra
Asia	Iran	Parsnet
Asia	Japan	Kyocera
Asia	Malaysia	Xperanti
Asia	Oman	Momkin
Asia	Singapore	UnaBiz
Asia	South Korea	Amotech
Asia	Taiwan	UnaBiz
Asia	Thailand	Things on Net
Asia	United Arab Emirates	iWire
Europe	Austria	Heliot IoT
Europe	Belgium	Citymesh
Europe	Croatia	IoT Net
Europe	Czech Republic	SimpleCell Networks
Europe	Denmark	IoT Denmark A/S
Europe	Estonia	Connected Baltics
Europe	Finland	Connected Finland
Europe	France	Sigfox
Europe	Germany	Sigfox
Europe	Hungary	Omnicell IoTnet
Europe	Ireland	VT
Europe	Italy	NetTrotter
Europe	Liechtenstein	Heliot IoT
Europe	Luxembourg	RMS
Europe	Malta	IoT Malta
Europe	Netherlands	Hyrde
Europe	Norway	IoT Norway
Europe	Poland	Sigfox Poland
Europe	Portugal	Sigfox
Europe	Romania	Simple IoT
Europe	Slovakia	SimpleCell Networks
Europe	Spain	Sigfox
Europe	Sweden	IoT Sweden
Europe	Switzerland	Heliot IoT
Europe	Turkey	UNA IoT
Europe	Ukraine	Utilix.one
Europe	United Kingdom	WND Group
North America	Costa Rica	WND Group
North America	El Salvador	WND Group
North America	Guadeloupe	IDEO Caraïbes
North America	Martinique	IDEO Caraïbes
North America	Mexico	IoTNet Mexico (operating as 0G IoT Solutions)
North America	Panama	WND Group
North America	United States	Sigfox
Oceania	Australia	Thinxtra
Oceania	French Polynesia	VITI
Oceania	New Caledonia	iSMAC-NC
Oceania	New Zealand	Thinxtra
South America	Argentina	WND Group
South America	Brazil	WND Group
South America	Chile	WND Group
South America	Colombia	WND Group
South America	Ecuador	WND Group
South America	French Guiana	IDEO Caraïbes
