= DASH7 =

Open-source wireless sensor and actuator network protocol

- International standard: Based on ISO/IEC 18000-7
- Developed by: DASH7 Alliance
- Industry: Automation, industrial, military
- Website: www.dash7-alliance.org

DASH7 Alliance Protocol (D7A) is an open-source wireless sensor and actuator network protocol, which operates in the 433 MHz, 868 MHz and 915 MHz unlicensed ISM/SRD band. DASH7 provides multi-year battery life, range of up to 2 km, low latency for connecting with moving things, a very small open-source protocol stack, AES 128-bit shared-key encryption support, and data transfer of up to 167 kbit/s. The DASH7 Alliance Protocol is the name of the technology promoted by the non-profit consortium called the DASH7 Alliance.

== International standard ==
DASH7 Alliance Protocol originates from the ISO/IEC 18000-7 standard describing a 433 MHz ISM band air interface for active RFID. This standard was mainly used for military logistics.

The DASH7 Alliance re-purposed the original 18000-7 technology in 2011 and made it evolve toward a wireless sensor network technology for commercial applications. The DASH7 Alliance Protocol covers all sub-GHz ISM bands, making it available globally. The name of the new protocol was derived from the section seven denoted as -7 (/dæʃ ˈsɛvən/) of the original standard document.

The current version of the DASH7 Alliance protocol is no longer compliant with the ISO/IEC 18000-7 standard.

=== History ===
In January 2009, the U.S. Department of Defense announced the largest RFID award in history, a $429 million contract for DASH7 devices, to four prime contractors, namely Savi Technology, Northrop Grumman Information Technology, Unisys and Systems & Processes Engineering Corporation (SPEC).

In March 2009, the DASH7 Alliance, a non-profit industry consortium to promote interoperability among DASH7-compliant devices, was announced, and as of July 2010 has more than 50 participants in 23 countries. It was meant to be similar to what the Wi-Fi Alliance does for IEEE 802.11, for wireless sensor networking.

In April 2011, the DASH7 Alliance announced adoption of DASH7 Mode 2, based on the ISO 18000-7 standard that makes better use of modern silicon to achieve faster throughput, multi-hop, lower latency, better security, sensor support, and a built-in query protocol.

In March 2012, the DASH7 Alliance announced that it was making the DASH7 Mode 2 specification available to non-members.

In July 2013, the DASH7 Alliance announced the DASH7 Alliance Protocol Draft 0.2.

In May 2015, the DASH7 Alliance publicly released v1.0 of the DASH7 Alliance Protocol.

In January 2017, the DASH7 Alliance publicly released the v1.1 of the DASH7 Alliance Protocol. The version constitutes a major update of v1.0, in particular in the area of security and interoperability.

== Technical summary ==
Compared with other wireless data technologies:

Global standard used	Frequency bands	Channel width	Range	Frequencies available globally (yes/no)	Maximum end node transmit power	Packet size	Data rate (uplink/downlink)	Topology	End node roaming allowed	Governing body
DASH7 Alliance Protocol 1.x	433/868/915 MHz ISM/SRD	25 kHz or 200 kHz	0–5 km		433 MHz: +10dBm 868/915 MHz: +27dBm	max. 256 bytes/packet	9.6 kbit/s, 55.55 kbit/s or 166.667 kbit/s	Node-to-node, Star, Tree	Yes	DASH7 Alliance
IEEE P802.11ah (low power Wi-Fi)	Unlicensed Sub-1 GHz bands (excluding TV whitespace)	1/2/4/8/16 MHz	Up to 1 km (outdoor)		Dependent on Regional Regulations (from 1 mW to 5 W)	Up to 7,991 Bytes (w/o Aggregation), up to 65,535 Bytes (with Aggregation)	150kbit/s	Star, Tree	Allowed by other 802.11 amendments (like 802.11r)	IEEE 802.11 working group
Ingenu RPMA	2.4 GHz ISM	1 MHz (40 channels available)	0–30 km		to 20 dBm	6B–10kB	AP aggregates to 624 kbit/s per Sector (Assumes 8 channel Access Point)/AP aggregates to 156 kbit/s per Sector (Assumes 8 channel Access Point)	Typically Star. Tree supported with an RPMA extender	Yes	Ingenu
LTE-Cat M	Cellular	1.4 MHz	2.5–5 km		100 mW	≈100 — ≈1000 bytes typical	≈200 kbit/s	Star	Yes	3GPP
LoRaWAN	433/868/780/915 MHz ISM	EU: 8x125 kHz, US 64x125 kHz/8x125 kHz, Modulation: Chirp Spread Spectrum	2–5 km (urban), 15 km (rural), 702 km LoS tested, 1500 km Link Budget		EU:<+14 dBm, US:<+27 dBm	User defined	EU: 300 bit/s to 50 kbit/s, US:900bit/s to 100 kbit/s	Star on Star	Yes	LoRa Alliance
nWave	Sub-1 GHz ISM	Ultra narrow band	10 km (urban), 20– 30 km (rural)		25–100 mW	12 byte header, 2- 20 byte payload	100 bit/s/-	Star	Yes	Weightless SIG
SigFox	868/902 MHz ISM	Ultra narrow band	30–50 km (rural), 3– 10 km (urban)		10μW to 100 mW	12 bytes (payload)	100 bit/s to 140 messages/day/max. 4 messages of 8 bytes/day	Star	Yes	SigFox
Weightless-W	400-800 MHz (TV whitespace)	5 MHz	5 km (urban)		17 dBm	10 byte min.	1 kbit/s to 10 Mbit/s	Star	Yes	Weightless SIG
Weightless-N	Sub-1 GHz ISM	Ultra narrow band (200 Hz)	3 km (urban)		17 dBm	Up to 20 bytes	100 bit/s/-	Star	Yes	Weightless SIG
Weightless-P	Sub-1 GHz ISM	12.5 kHz	2 km (urban)		17 dBm	10 byte min.	200 bit/s to 100 kbit/s	Star	Yes	Weightless SIG

=== BLAST networking technology ===
Networks based on DASH7 differ from typical wire-line and wireless networks utilizing a "session". DASH7 networks serve applications in which low power usage is essential and data transmission is typically much slower and/or sporadic, like basic telemetry. Thus, instead of replicating a wire-line "session", DASH7 was designed with the concept of B.L.A.S.T.:

- Bursty: Data transfer is abrupt and does not include content such as video, audio, or other isochronous forms of data.
- Light: For most applications, packet sizes are limited to 256 bytes. Transmission of multiple consecutive packets may occur, but is generally avoided, if possible.
- Asynchronous: DASH7's main method of communication is by command–response, which by design requires no periodic network "hand-shaking" or synchronization between devices.
- Stealth: DASH7 devices do not need periodic beaconing to be able to respond in communication.
- Transitive: A DASH7 system of devices is inherently mobile or transitional. Unlike other wireless technologies, DASH7 is upload-centric, not download-centric, thus devices do not need to be managed extensively by fixed infrastructure, i.e., base stations.

=== Sub 1-GHz ===
D7A utilizes the 433, 868 and 916 MHz frequencies, which are globally available and license-free.

Sub 1-GHz is ideal for wireless sensor networking applications, since it penetrates concrete and water, but also has the ability to propagate over very long ranges without requiring a large power draw on a battery. The low input current of typical tag configurations allows operating on coin cell or thin-film batteries.

=== Tag-to-tag communications ===
Unlike most active RFID or LPWAN technologies, DASH7 supports tag-to-tag communications.

=== Localization ===
Localization techniques can be applied to DASH7 endpoints. An accuracy of 1 m using DASH7 beacons at 433 MHz has been achieved in a lab experiment.

=== Integrated query protocol ===
DASH7 supports a built-in query protocol that minimizes "round trips" for most messaging applications that results in lower latency and higher network throughput.

=== Range ===
DASH7 provides a link budget of up to 140 dB with 27 dBm transmission power, which positions the technology as medium-range, compared to short-range (Bluetooth, Wi-Fi, ...) and long-range (LoRaWAN, SigFox). Note that higher ranges are always obtained at the expense of per-bit power consumption and transmission duration. Low-power long-range technologies are generally not truly bi-directional, as the regular scanning duty is pretty high. In this context, DASH7 is a very good compromise between range, power consumption, and bi-directionality and is very suitable for industrial applications with effective range of 100 to 500 m.

In line-of-sight situations, DASH7 devices today advertise read ranges of 1 kilometer or more, however, ranges of up to 10 km have been tested by Savi Technology and are easily achievable in the European Union, where governmental regulations are less constrained than in the USA.

=== Interoperability ===
The DASH7 Alliance is currently working on a certification program that functionally tests the DASH7 devices. The certification is composed of a set of test scenarios covering transactions in different stack configurations (channel, QoS, security). The physical wireless interface is not covered by the certification and will have to comply to local radio regulations.

=== Alternative modulations ===
The DASH7 Alliance policy forbids the addition of proprietary or licensable modulation techniques in the official DASH7 Alliance Protocol. However, the layered structure of the protocol allows simple integration of alternative modulations, such as LoRa, under the network layer (D7ANL).

== Applications ==
=== Commercial applications ===
Similar to other networking technologies that began with the defense sector, e.g., the Defense Advanced Research Projects Agency (DARPA) funding ARPANET, the precursor to the Internet, DASH7 is similarly suited to a wide range of applications in development or being deployed, including:

- Building automation, access control, smart energy — DASH7's signal propagation characteristics allow it to penetrate walls, windows, doors, and other substances that serve as impediments to other technologies operating at 2.45 GHz, for example. For smart energy and building automation applications, DASH7 networks can be deployed with far less infrastructure than competing technologies and at far lower total cost of ownership.
- Location-based services — DASH7 is being used today for developing new location-based services using a range of DASH7-enabled devices, including smartcards, keyfobs, tickets, watches and other conventional products that can take advantage of the unique small footprint, low power, long range, and low cost of DASH7 relative to less practical and high-power wireless technologies like Wi-Fi or Bluetooth. Using DASH7, users can "check in" to venues in ways not practical with current check-in technologies like GPS, that are power-intensive and fail indoors and in urban environments. Location-based services like Foursquare, Novitaz, or Facebook can exploit this capability in DASH7 and award loyalty points, allow users to view the Facebook or X, formally known as Twitter, addresses of those walking past, and more.
- Mobile advertising — DASH7 is being developed for "smart" billboards and kiosks, likewise "smart" posters that can be read from many meters (or even kilometers) away, creating new opportunities for both tracking the effectiveness of advertising expenditures, but also creating new e-commerce opportunities. DASH7's potential to automate check-ins and check-outs provides essential infrastructure to location-based advertising and promotions
- Automotive — DASH7 is increasingly seen as the next-generation tire-pressure monitoring system (TPMS), given its operation at the same frequency (433 MHz) as nearly all proprietary TPMS today. DASH7-based TPMS will provide end users with more accurate tire pressure readings, resulting in greater fuel economy, reduced tire wear, and greater safety. DASH7 products are also being designed and used for other automotive applications like supply chain visibility.
- Logistics — DASH7 is being used today for tracking the whereabouts of shipping containers, pallets, roll cages, trucks, rail cars, maritime vessels, and other supply chain assets, providing businesses with unprecedented visibility into their everyday operations. Also cold chain management (vaccines, fresh produce, cut flowers, etc.), whereby DASH7 is used for monitoring the in-transit temperature and other environmental factors that can adversely affect the integrity of sensitive products.

== Developer support ==
=== OSS-7: Dash7 open-source stack ===
The goal of the project is to provide a reference implementation of the DASH7 Alliance protocol. This implementation should focus on completeness, correctness and being easy to understand. Performance and code size are less important aspects. For clarity, a clear separation between the ISO layers is maintained in the code. The project is available on GitHub and is licensed under the Apache License, version 2.0.

=== OpenTag ===
DASH7 Mode 2 developers benefit from the open-source firmware library called OpenTag, which provides developers with a "C"-based environment in which to develop DASH7 applications quickly. So in addition to DASH7 (ISO 18000-7) being an open source, ISO standard, OpenTag is an open-source stack that is quite unlike other wireless sensor networking (e.g. ZigBee) and active RFID (e.g. proprietary) options elsewhere in the marketplace today. Even though OpenTag is an open-source project, people may not be able to use it free of charge. As of August 2015, there is no evidence to suggest that OpenTag bears a royalty, although current versions of OpenTag license do include a provision permitting RAND licensing.

=== Semiconductor industry support ===
DASH7 developers receive support from the semiconductor industry including multiple options, with Texas Instruments, ST Microelectronics, Silicon Labs, Semtech and Analog Devices all offering DASH7-enabled hardware development kits or system-on-a-chip products.

=== Device integrators and development kits ===
Many companies are members of the DASH7 Alliance to produce DASH7-compliant hardware products:

- DASH7 Alliance members
- DASH7 development kits
- DASH7 Service Providers
