= ISO/IEC 18000-7 =

The ISO/IEC 18000-7 air interface standard was originally ratified in 2004, modified once in 2008, and modified again to its current version in 2014. ISO/IEC 18000-7:2014 provides technical specifications for radio-frequency identification (RFID) devices operating in the 433 MHz band.

Specific attributes defined by the standard include operating frequency, operating channel accuracy, occupied channel bandwidth, maximum power, spurious emissions, modulation, duty cycle, data coding, bit rate, dit rate accuracy, bit transmission order, operating channel, chip rate, and attributes relating to frequency-hopping spread spectrum. The standard was created with the intention of promoting compatibility of devices within the international RFID market.

== See also ==
- ISO/IEC 18000
