= Short-range device =

Class of radio transmitter

A short-range device (SRD), described by ECC Recommendation 70-03, is a radio-frequency transmitter device used in telecommunication that has little capability of causing harmful interference to other radio equipment.

Short-range devices are low-power transmitters, typically limited to 25–100 mW effective radiated power (ERP) or less, depending on the frequency band, which limits their useful range to a few hundred meters, which do not require licenses to use.

Short-range Wireless technologies include Bluetooth, Wi-Fi, NearLink, near-field communication (NFC), LPWAN, ultra-wideband (UWB) and IEEE 802.15.4. They are implemented by chips fabricated as RF CMOS integrated circuit (RF circuit). As of 2009, short-range wireless chips ship approximately 1.7 billion units annually, with Bluetooth accounting for over 55% of shipments and Wi-Fi around 35% of shipments.

Applications for short-range wireless devices include power meters and other remote instrumentation, RFID applications, radio-controlled models, fire, security and social alarms, vehicle radars, wireless microphones and earphones, traffic signs and signals (including control signals), remote garage door openers and car keys, barcode readers, motion detectors, and many others.

The European Commission mandates through CEPT and ETSI the allocation of several device bands for these purposes, restricts the parameters of their use, and provides guidelines for avoiding radio interference.

== Frequency bands ==
According to ECC Rec. 70-03, there are several annexes which encapsulate specific usage patterns, maximum emission power and duty cycle requirements.

Frequency allocation in Rec. 70-03
Frequency	Band	Notes
Annex 1. Non-specific short-range devices
6765–6795 kHz	ISM	
13.553–13.567 MHz	ISM	RFID
26.957–27.283 MHz	ISM	Citizens' Band
40.660–40.700 MHz	ISM	
138.20–138.45 MHz		
433.050–434.790 MHz	ISM	LPD433 (70-centimeter band); also an Amateur Radio band
863–870 MHz	ISM	SRD860
915–928 MHz	ISM	SRD860
2400.0–2483.5 MHz	ISM	13-centimeter band Heavily used by Wi-Fi; also an Amateur Radio band (Up to 2450 MHz)
5725–5875 MHz	ISM	5-centimeter band; also an Amateur Radio band (Up to 5850 MHz)
24.00–24.25 GHz	ISM	1.2-centimeter band; also an Amateur Radio band
61.0–61.5 GHz	ISM	
122–123 GHz	ISM	2.5-millimeter band; also an Amateur Radio band
244–246 GHz	ISM	1-millimeter band; also an Amateur Radio band
3.1–4.8 THz		
6–9 THz		
Annex 2. Tracking, tracing and data acquisition
456.9–457.1 kHz		Detection of avalanche victims
169.4–169.475 MHz		Remote meter reading
169.4–169.475 MHz		Asset tracking and tracing
Annex 3. Wideband data transmission systems
2400.0–2483.5 MHz	ISM	Wi-Fi, Bluetooth, etc.
57–66 GHz	V	WiGig, WirelessHD, etc.
Annex 4. Railway applications
2446–2454 MHz		Automatic vehicle identification systems for railways
27.090–27.100 MHz		Balise tele-powering and down-link (train to ground) systems
984–7484 kHz		Balise up-link (ground to train) systems
7.3–23.0 MHz		Loop up-link (ground to train) systems
Annex 5. Road transport and traffic telematics (RTTT)
5795–5805 MHz; 5805-5815 MHz	C	
63–64 GHz	V	Vehicle to vehicle and road to vehicle systems
76–77 GHz	W	Vehicle radar and infrastructure radar systems
21.65–26.65 GHz	K	Automotive short range radars (SRR) (marketed until July 2013)
77–81 GHz	W	Automotive short range radars (SRR)
24.050–24.075 GHz; 24.075–24.150 GHz; 24.150–24.250 GHz	ISM	Vehicle radars
Annex 6. Radiodetermination applications
2400.0–2483.5	ISM	
9200–9500 MHz; 9500–9975 MHz		
10.5–10.6 GHz		
13.4–14.0 GHz		
24.05–24.25 GHz	ISM	
4.5–7.0 GHz		Tank level probing radar (TLPR)
8.5–10.6 GHz		Tank level probing radar (TLPR)
24.05–27.00 GHz		Tank level probing radar (TLPR)
57–64 GHz		Tank level probing radar (TLPR)
75–85 GHz		Tank level probing radar (TLPR)
17.1–17.3 GHz		Ground-based synthetic aperture radar
Annex 7. Alarms
868.6–868.7 MHz		
869.250–869.300 MHz		
869.650–869.700 MHz		
869.200–869.250 MHz		
869.300–869.400 MHz		
169.4750–169.4875 MHz		Social alarms (exclusive use)
169.5875–169.6000 MHz		Social alarms (exclusive use)
Annex 8. Model control
26.995, 27.045, 27.095, 27.145, 27.195 MHz		
34.995–35.225 MHz		Only for flying models
40.665, 40.675, 40.685, 40.695 MHz		
Annex 9. Inductive applications
Annex 10. Radio microphone applications including aids for the hearing impaired
29.7–47.0 MHz		except 30.3–30.5 MHz, 32.15–32.45 MHz and 41.015–47.00 MHz (harmonised military bands)
173.965–174.015		Aids for the hearing impaired
863–865 MHz		Individual licence required
470–786 MHz		Individual licence required
786–789 MHz		Individual licence required
823–826 MHz; 826–832 MHz		Individual licence required
1785–1795 MHz; 1795–1800 MHz		Individual licence required
169.4000–169.4750 MHz		Aids for the hearing impaired. Individual licence may be required
169.4875–169.5875 MHz		Aids for the hearing impaired. Individual licence may be required
Annex 11. Radio frequency identification applications
2446–2454 MHz; 2446–2454 MHz		
865.0–865.6 MHz; 865.6–867.6 MHz; 867.6–868.0 MHz		
Annex 12. Active medical implants and their associated peripherals
Annex 13. Wireless audio applications
863–865 MHz; 864.8–865.0	SRD860	
1795–1800 MHz		
87.5–108.0 MHz	FM	

=== SRD860 ===
In Europe, 863 to 870 MHz band has been allocated for license-free operation using FHSS, DSSS, or analog modulation with either a transmission duty cycle of 0.1%, 1% or 10% depending on the band, or Listen Before Talk (LBT) with Adaptive Frequency Agility (AFA). Although this band falls under the Short Range Device umbrella, it is being used in Low-Power Wide-Area Network (LPWAN) wireless telecommunication networks, designed to allow long-range communications at a low bit rate among things (connected objects).

Frequency	Duty cycle	Channel spacing	ERP
863.0–865.0 MHz	100% (wireless audio)		10 mW
863.0–865.6 MHz	0.1% or LBT+AFA		25 mW
863.0–868.0 MHz *			25 mW wideband up to 1 MHz (data only)
865.0–868.0 MHz	1% or LBT+AFA		25 mW
865.0–868.0 MHz *	0.1% or LBT+AFA	4 frequencies	2 W (RFID only)
865.0–868.0 MHz *	10% (access points), 2.5% (other devices)	4 frequencies	500 mW (data only, power control required)
868.0–868.6 MHz	1% or LBT+AFA		25 mW
868.6–868.7 MHz	1% (alarms)	25 kHz	10 mW
868.7–869.2 MHz	0.1% or LBT+AFA		25 mW
869.2–869.25 MHz	0.1% (social alarms)	25 kHz	10 mW
869.25–869.3 MHz	0.1% (alarms)	25 kHz	10 mW
869.3–869.4 MHz	1% (alarms)	25 kHz	10 mW
869.4–869.65 MHz	10% or LBT+AFA	25 kHz	500 mW
869.65–869.7 MHz	10% (alarms)	25 kHz	25 mW
869.7–870.0 MHz	100% (voice communication)		5 mW
869.7–870.0 MHz	1% or LBT+AFA		25 mW

(* = as of 1 January 2018)

As of December 2011, unrestricted voice communications are allowed in the 869.7-870.0 MHz band with channel spacing of 25 kHz or less and maximum power output of 5 mW ERP.

SRD860 handheld transceivers were briefly available in mid 2000s, however they did not offer dual-band compatibility with PMR446 and LPD433 bands. As of 2012, they have been put off-market.

From January 2018, the four RFID frequencies are also available for data networks, with a power up to 500 mW and a bandwidth of 200 kHz. The center frequencies are: 865.7, 866.3, 866.9 and 867.5 MHz. Specific restrictions on usage apply, such as a low duty cycle, LBT (listen before transmit) and APC (adaptive power control).

== See also ==
- DASH7
