= European Conference of Postal and Telecommunications Administrations =

European regulatory agency umbrella organization

- CEPT logo, designed by Michael Goaman

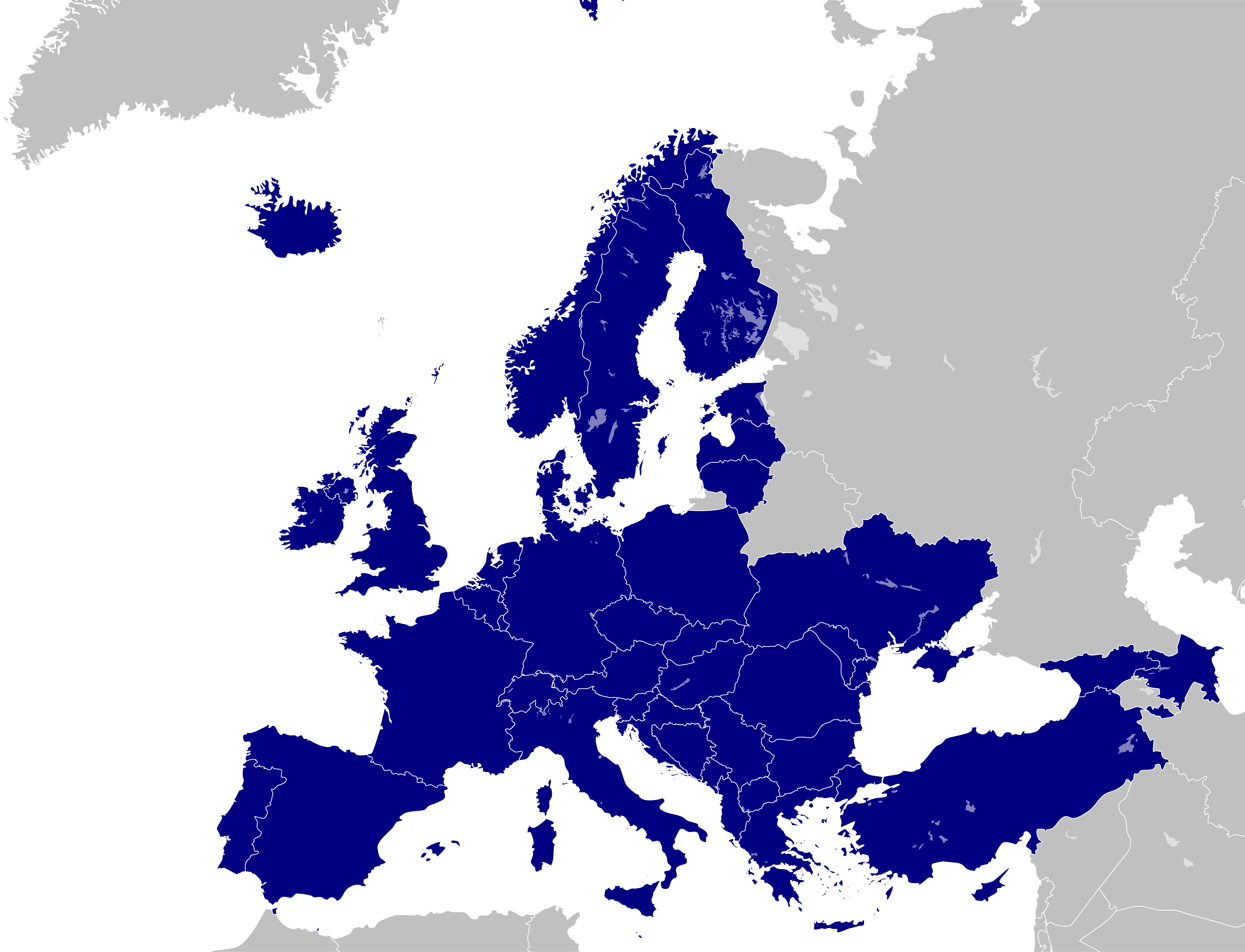
- Map of current CEPT member states (Belarus and Russia have been suspended as of 2022)
- Formation: 26 June 1959; 67 years ago
- Headquarters: Nyropsgade 37
- Location: Copenhagen, Denmark
- Members: 46 countries
- Co-presidency: The Chair of ECC, The Chair of CERP and the Chair of Com-ITU
- Website: www.cept.org

The European Conference of Postal and Telecommunications Administrations (CEPT) was established on 26 June 1959 by nineteen European states in Montreux, Switzerland, as a coordinating body for European state telecommunications and postal organizations. The acronym comes from the French version of its name, Conférence européenne des administrations des postes et des télécommunications.

CEPT was responsible for the creation of the European Telecommunications Standards Institute (ETSI) in 1988.

== Organization ==
CEPT is organised into three main components:

- Electronic Communications Committee (ECC) – responsible for radiocommunications and telecommunications matters and formed by the merger of ECTRA (European Committee for Telecommunications Regulatory Affairs) and ERC (European Radiocommunications Committee) in September 2001
  - The permanent secretariat of the ECC is the European Communications Office (ECO)
- European Committee for Postal Regulation (CERP, after the French "Comité européen des régulateurs postaux") – responsible for postal matters
- The committee for ITU Policy (Com-ITU) is responsible for organising the co-ordination of CEPT actions for the preparation for and during the course of the ITU activities meetings of the council, Plenipotentiary Conferences, World Telecommunication Development Conferences, World Telecommunication Standardisation Assemblies

The entity is based on the concept of a Postal, telegraph and telephone service entity.

== Member countries ==
As of Jan 2026: 46 countries.

Albania, Andorra, Austria, Azerbaijan, Belgium, Bosnia and Herzegovina, Bulgaria, Croatia, Cyprus, Czech Republic, Denmark, Estonia, Finland, France, Georgia, Germany, Greece, Hungary, Iceland, Ireland, Italy, Latvia, Liechtenstein, Lithuania, Luxembourg, Malta, Moldova, Monaco, Montenegro, Netherlands, North Macedonia, Norway, Poland, Portugal, Romania, San Marino, Serbia, Slovak Republic, Slovenia, Spain, Sweden, Switzerland, Turkey, Ukraine, United Kingdom, Vatican City. The Russian Federation and Belarus memberships were suspended indefinitely on 17 March 2022.

== See also ==
- Europa postage stamp
- CEPT Recommendation T/CD 06-01 (standard for videotex)
- E-carrier (standard for multiplexed telephone circuits)
- International Telecommunication Union
- LPD433
- PMR446
- SRD860
- Universal Postal Union
- WiMAX
- African Telecommunications Union (ATU)
- Asia-Pacific Telecommunity (APT)
- Caribbean Postal Union (CPU)
- Caribbean Telecommunications Union (CTU)
- Inter-American Telecommunication Commission (CITEL)
- Postal Union of the Americas, Spain and Portugal
- List of members of the Universal Postal Union
