= Supplier association =

A supplier association is a business term used when a customer company brings a group of its major suppliers together on a formal and regular basis in order to achieve strategic and operational alignment. In a Japanese manufacturing context they are referred to as kyoryoku kai.

== Structure and process ==
A typical association will start with a vision/strategy with defined key goals/benefits usually derived initially by the customer company. A team will be formed with key strategic suppliers with the executives of those companies ratifying the goals and developing a plan for how the strategy will be achieved. A series of meetings, workshops and one-to-one activities targeted at delivering the association's strategy will then take place with regular reviews between the organization's members to review progress.

== Benefits ==
The use of supplier associations originated from Japanese manufacturing, where they are referred to as Kyoryoku Kai. Such groups are in widespread use in Japan.

Supplier associations are used to develop awareness, education and change programs that are designed to achieve improvements. As such supplier associations are associated with a variety of benefits facilitating supplier development. This includes reducing operating costs, sharing best practice, training and strengthening the relationship between the organization's members.

== Problems with supplier associations ==
There are also difficulties associated with supplier associations, these include the customer firm using the association as a method to exert control over its suppliers who may also become too dependent. Supplier associations rely on trust between organizations and where this is not embraced (for example sharing the results of improvement programs, or leaking of information to competition) benefits may be reduced. Targets and momentum are required to make supplier associations a success and where this is absent there is potential for the association to become a “talking shop”. without deriving meaningful improvements.

== Expanding supplier associations ==
A common occurrence within associations is that they are extended vertically within the supplier community – for example – by the mid-1990s 79% of Toyota’s tier 1 suppliers had created their own associations extending beyond Toyota’s existing one. This approach to expanding associations depends on organizational size, similarity and size of the supply chain. Kyohokai, Toyota's global supplier association, has 224 members and 29 directors and is organised with a General Assembly responsible for major business decisions and budgeting, and sectional meetings for companies contributing to different aspects of the finished Toyota product. Kyohokai receives no funding from Toyota. In 2012 the US Justice Department charged a number of executives at five Japanese parts manufacturers with price-fixing and bid-rigging. Three of the firms, which were members of Kyohokai, pleaded guilty and faced fines amounting to $748 million. Also in 2012, four member corporations were raided by the Japanese Fair Trade Commission following concerns raised about their compliance with anti-monopoly legislation.
