= ISM radio band =

Radio frequency allocations

The ISM radio bands are portions of the radio spectrum reserved internationally for industrial, scientific and medical (ISM) purposes, excluding applications in telecommunications. Examples of applications for the use of radio frequency (RF) energy in these bands include RF heating, microwave ovens, and medical diathermy machines. The powerful emissions of these devices can create electromagnetic interference and disrupt radio communication using the same frequency, so these devices are limited to certain bands of frequencies. In general, communications equipment operating in ISM bands must tolerate any interference generated by ISM applications, and users have no regulatory protection from ISM device operation in these bands.

Despite the intent of the original allocations, in recent years the fastest-growing use of these bands has been for short-range, low-power wireless communications systems, since these bands are often approved for such devices, which can be used without a government license, as would otherwise be required for transmitters; ISM frequencies are often chosen for this purpose as they already must tolerate interference issues. Cordless phones, Bluetooth devices, near-field communication (NFC) devices, garage door openers, baby monitors, and wireless computer networks (Wi-Fi) may all use the ISM frequencies, although these low-power transmitters are not considered to be ISM devices.

== Definition ==
The ISM bands are defined by the ITU Radio Regulations (article 5) in footnotes 5.138, 5.150, and 5.280 of the Radio Regulations. Individual countries' use of the bands designated in these sections may differ due to variations in national radio regulations. Because communication devices using the ISM bands must tolerate any interference from ISM equipment, unlicensed operations are typically permitted to use these bands, since unlicensed operation typically needs to be tolerant of interference from other devices anyway. The ISM bands share allocations with unlicensed and licensed operations; however, due to the high likelihood of harmful interference, licensed use of the bands is typically low. In the United States, uses of the ISM bands are governed by Part 18 of the Federal Communications Commission (FCC) rules, while Part 15 contains the rules for unlicensed communication devices, even those that share ISM frequencies. In Europe, the ETSI develops standards for the use of short-range devices, some of which operate in ISM bands. The use of the ISM bands is regulated by the national spectrum regulation authorities that are members of the CEPT.

=== Frequency allocations ===
The allocation of radio frequencies is provided according to Article 5 of the ITU Radio Regulations (edition 2012).

In order to improve harmonisation in spectrum utilisation, the majority of service allocations stipulated in this document were incorporated in national tables of frequency allocations and utilisations which are within the responsibilities of the appropriate national administrations. The allocation might be primary, secondary, exclusive, or shared. Exclusive or shared utilization is within the responsibility of administrations.

ITU frequency allocations
Frequency range		Center frequency	Bandwidth	Type	Availability	Primary user	Other users
6.765 MHz	6.795 MHz	6.78 MHz	30 kHz	A	Subject to local acceptance	Fixed service	Mobile service
13.553 MHz	13.567 MHz	13.56 MHz	14 kHz	B	Worldwide	Fixed	Mobile services except Aeronautical mobile (R) service
26.957 MHz	27.283 MHz	27.12 MHz	326 kHz	B	Worldwide	Fixed & mobile service except Aeronautical mobile service	CB Radio
40.66 MHz	40.7 MHz	40.68 MHz	40 kHz	B	Worldwide		Fixed, mobile services & Earth exploration-satellite service
169.4 MHz	169.8125 MHz	169.606 MHz	412.5 kHz	A	only in EU, subject to local acceptance		Previously used by ERMES, today mostly used by Wize
433.05 MHz	434.79 MHz	433.92 MHz	1.74 MHz	A	only in Region 1, subject to local acceptance	Amateur service & radiolocation service	With provisions of footnote 5.280
902 MHz	928 MHz	915 MHz	26 MHz	B	Region 2 only (with some exceptions)	Fixed	Mobile except aeronautical mobile & Radiolocation service; in Region 2 additional Amateur service
2.4 GHz	2.5 GHz	2.45 GHz	100 MHz	B	Worldwide	Fixed, mobile, radiolocation	Amateur & amateur-satellite service
5.725 GHz	5.875 GHz	5.8 GHz	150 MHz	B	Worldwide	Fixed-satellite, radiolocation, mobile	Amateur & amateur-satellite service
24 GHz	24.25 GHz	24.125 GHz	250 MHz	B	Worldwide	Amateur, amateur-satellite, radiolocation	Earth exploration-satellite service (active)
61 GHz	61.5 GHz	61.25 GHz	500 MHz	A	Subject to local acceptance	Fixed, inter-satellite, mobile & radiolocation service	
122 GHz	123 GHz	122.5 GHz	1 GHz	A	Subject to local acceptance	Earth exploration satellite (passive), fixed, inter-satellite, mobile, space research (passive)	Amateur service
244 GHz	246 GHz	245 GHz	2 GHz	A	Subject to local acceptance	radiolocation, radio astronomy	Amateur & amateur-satellite service

Type A (footnote 5.138) = frequency bands are designated for ISM applications. The use of these frequency bands for ISM applications shall be subject to special authorization by the administration concerned, in agreement with other administrations whose radiocommunication services might be affected. In applying this provision, administrations shall have due regard to the latest relevant ITU-R Recommendations.

Type B (footnote 5.150) = frequency bands are also designated for ISM applications. Radiocommunication services operating within these bands must accept harmful interference which may be caused by these applications.

ITU RR, (Footnote 5.280) = In Germany, Austria, Bosnia and Herzegovina, Croatia, North Macedonia, Liechtenstein, Montenegro, Portugal, Serbia, Slovenia and Switzerland, the band 433.05–434.79 MHz (center frequency 433.92 MHz) is designated for ISM applications. Radio communication services of these countries operating within this band must accept harmful interference which may be caused by these applications.

== History ==
The ISM bands were first established at the International Telecommunications Conference of the ITU in Atlantic City, 1947. The American delegation specifically proposed several bands, including the now commonplace 2.4 GHz band, to accommodate the then nascent process of microwave heating; however, FCC annual reports of that time suggest that much preparation was done ahead of these presentations.

The report of the August 9th 1947 meeting of the Allocation of Frequencies committee includes the remark:

"The delegate of the United States, referring to his request that the frequency 2450 Mc/s be allocated for I.S.M., indicated that there was in existence in the United States, and working on this frequency a diathermy machine and an electronic cooker, and that the latter might eventually be installed in transatlantic ships and airplanes. There was therefore some point in attempting to reach world agreement on this subject."

Radio frequencies in the ISM bands have been used for communication purposes, although such devices may experience interference from non-communication sources. In the United States, as early as 1958 Class D Citizens Band, a Part 95 service, was allocated to frequencies that are also allocated to ISM. [1]

In the U.S., the FCC first made unlicensed spread spectrum available in the ISM bands in rules adopted on May 9, 1985. The FCC action was proposed by Michael Marcus of the FCC staff in 1980 and the subsequent regulatory action took five more years. It was part of a broader proposal to allow civil use of spread spectrum technology and was opposed at the time by mainstream equipment manufacturers and many radio system operators.

Many other countries later developed similar regulations, enabling use of this technology.

== Applications ==
Industrial, scientific and medical (ISM) applications (of radio frequency energy) (ISM applications) are – according to article 1.15 of the International Telecommunication Union's (ITU) ITU Radio Regulations (RR) – defined as «Operation of equipment or appliances designed to generate and use locally radio frequency energy for industrial, scientific, medical, domestic or similar purposes, excluding applications in the field of telecommunications.»

The original ISM specifications envisioned that the bands would be used primarily for noncommunication purposes, such as heating. The bands are still widely used for these purposes. For many people, the most commonly encountered ISM device is the home microwave oven operating at 2.45 GHz which uses microwaves to cook food. Industrial heating is another big application area; such as induction heating, microwave heat treating, plastic softening, and plastic welding processes. In medical settings, shortwave and microwave diathermy machines use radio waves in the ISM bands to apply deep heating to the body for relaxation and healing. More recently hyperthermia therapy uses microwaves to heat tissue to kill cancer cells.

However, as detailed below, the increasing congestion of the radio spectrum, the increasing sophistication of microelectronics, and the attraction of unlicensed use, has in recent decades led to an explosion of uses of these bands for short range communication systems for wireless devices, which are now by far the largest uses of these bands. These are sometimes called "non ISM" uses since they do not fall under the originally envisioned "industrial", "scientific", and "medical" application areas.

One of the largest applications has been wireless networking (Wi-Fi). The IEEE 802.11ah wireless networking protocols, the standards on which almost all wireless systems are based, use the ISM bands. Virtually all laptops, tablet computers, computer printers and cellphones now have 802.11 wireless modems using the 2.4 and 5.7 GHz ISM bands. Bluetooth is another networking technology using the 2.4 GHz band, which can be problematic given the probability of interference.

Near-field communication (NFC) devices such as proximity cards and contactless smart cards use the lower-frequency 13 and 27 MHz ISM bands.

Other short-range devices using the ISM bands are: wireless microphones, baby monitors, garage door openers, wireless doorbells, keyless entry systems for vehicles, radio control channels for UAVs (drones), wireless surveillance systems, RFID systems for merchandise, and wild animal tracking systems.

Multiple international LoRa standards use ISM bands for low-power, long-range, low-rate data transmission.

Some electrodeless lamp designs are ISM devices, which use RF emissions to excite fluorescent tubes. Sulfur lamps are commercially available plasma lamps, which use 2.45 GHz magnetrons to heat sulfur into a brightly glowing plasma.

Long-distance wireless power systems have been proposed and experimented with which would use high-power transmitters and rectennas, in lieu of overhead transmission lines and underground cables, to send power to remote locations. NASA has studied using microwave power transmission on 2.45 GHz to send energy collected by solar power satellites back to the ground.

Also in space applications, a helicon double-layer ion thruster is a prototype spacecraft propulsion engine which uses a 13.56 MHz transmission to break down and heat gas into plasma.

== Common non-ISM uses ==
In recent years ISM bands have also been shared with (non-ISM) license-free error-tolerant communications applications such as wireless sensor networks in the 915 MHz and 2.450 GHz bands, as well as wireless LANs and cordless phones in the 915 MHz, 2.450 GHz, and 5.800 GHz bands. Because unlicensed devices are required to be tolerant of ISM emissions in these bands, unlicensed low-power users are generally able to operate in these bands without causing problems for ISM users. ISM equipment does not necessarily include a radio receiver in the ISM band (e.g. a microwave oven does not have a receiver).

In the United States, according to 47 CFR Part 15.5, low power communication devices must accept interference from licensed users of that frequency band, and the Part 15 device must not cause interference to licensed users. Note that the 915 MHz band should not be used in countries outside Region 2, except those that specifically allow it, such as Australia (915 MHz to 928 MHz) and Israel, especially those that use the GSM-900 band for cellphones. The ISM bands are also widely used for radio-frequency identification (RFID) applications with the most commonly used band being the 13.56 MHz band used by systems compliant with ISO/IEC 14443 including those used by biometric passports and contactless smart cards.

In Europe, the use of the ISM band is covered by Short Range Device regulations issued by European Commission, based on technical recommendations by CEPT and standards by ETSI. In most of Europe, LPD433 band is allowed for license-free voice communication in addition to PMR446.

Wireless network devices use wavebands as follows:

- IEEE 802.11/Wi-Fi 2450 MHz and 5800 MHz bands
- Bluetooth 2450 MHz band falls under WPAN
- ANT / ANT+ (originates from Adaptive Network Topology) is a proprietary (but open access) multicast wireless sensor network technology designed and marketed by ANT Wireless. ANT devices may use any RF frequency from 2400 MHz to 2524 MHz, with the exception of 2457 MHz, which is reserved for ANT+ devices.
- IEEE 802.15.4 – Zigbee and other personal area networks may use the 915 MHz and 2450 MHz ISM bands because of frequency sharing between different allocations.
- LoRa (a physical layer of the LoRaWAN protocol) uses various wavebands, including ISM wavebands 433 MHz and 902-928 MHz in some regions.

Wireless LANs and cordless phones can also use bands other than those shared with ISM, but such uses require approval on a country by country basis. DECT phones use allocated spectrum outside the ISM bands that differs in Europe and North America. Ultra-wideband LANs require more spectrum than the ISM bands can provide, so the relevant standards such as IEEE 802.15.4a are designed to make use of spectrum outside the ISM bands. Despite the fact that these additional bands are outside the official ITU-R ISM bands, because they are used for the same types of low power personal communications, they are sometimes incorrectly referred to as ISM bands as well.

Several brands of radio control equipment use the 2.4 GHz band range for low power remote control of toys, from gas powered cars to miniature aircraft.

Worldwide Digital Cordless Telecommunications or WDCT is a technology that uses the 2.4 GHz radio spectrum.

Google's Project Loon used ISM bands (specifically 2.4 and 5.8 GHz bands) for balloon-to-balloon and balloon-to-ground communications.

Pursuant to 47 CFR Part 97 some ISM bands are used by licensed amateur radio operators for communication – including amateur television.

== See also ==
- Short-range device
- Frequency allocation
- Fixed wireless
- LPD433
- 2.4 GHz radio use
