= Comparison of 802.15.4 radio modules =

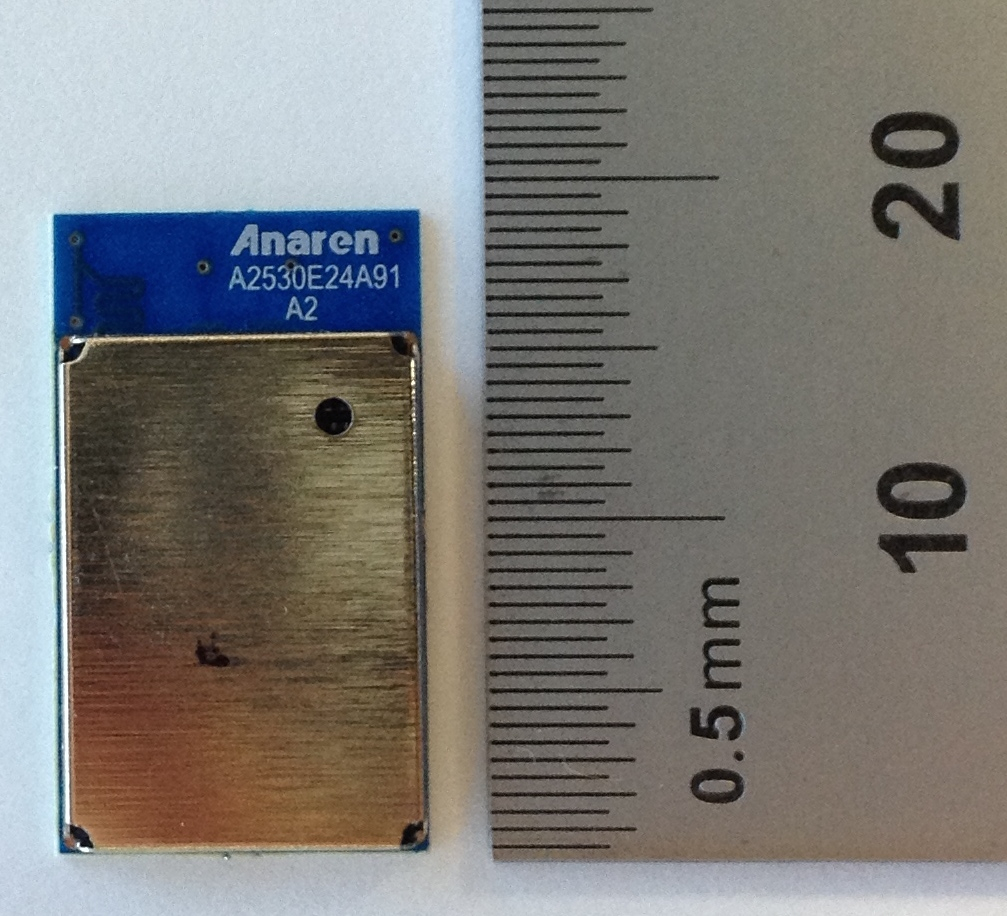
IEEE 802.15.4 Module

An 802.15.4 radio module is a small device used to communicate wirelessly with other devices according to the IEEE 802.15.4 protocol.

This table lists production ready-to-use certified modules only, not radio chips. A ready-to-use module is a complete system with a transceiver, and optionally an MCU and antenna on a printed circuit board. While most of the modules in this list are Zigbee, Thread, ISA100.11a, or WirelessHART modules, some do not contain enough flash memory to implement a Zigbee stack and instead run plain 802.15.4 protocol, sometimes with a lighter wireless protocol on top.

== Transceiver-only modules ==
These modules only include the RF transceiver and do not include a microprocessor. As a result, the protocol stack will need to be handled by an external IC. They are lower in price than modules which contain a microprocessor and enable the integrator to choose any microprocessor. However, potentially more work is required for integrating the MCU and module.

The following table lists vendor by alphabetical order:

Manufacturer	Module	Transceiver Chip	Antenna	Sleep	TX	RX	TX Power	Sensitivity	PCB Size	Released	Interfacing	Protocol stacks
FlexiPanel Ltd	EasyBee	Texas Instruments CC2420	integral		18 mA	20 mA	0 dBm		26 mm × 20 mm	Mar, 2008	?	Zigbee stack
Embit	EMB-TRX169PA, 169 MHz	CC1120	U.FL connector	<1 μA	400 mA @ +27 dBm	27 mA (full sens.)	27 dBm	-122 dBm	16 mm × 26 mm	2013	UART, SPI, JTAG	Wireless M-Bus stack
Microchip Technology	MRF24J40MA	MRF24J40	PCB trace	2 μA	23 mA	19 mA	0 dBm	–94 dBm	17.8 mm × 27.9 mm	Jun, 2008	SPI	Microchip Zigbee; MiWi; MiWi P2P

== Integrated MCU and transceiver modules ==
The following table lists vendor by alphabetical order:

Manufacturer	Module	SOC/SIP Chip	MCU core	RAM	Flash	Antenna	Sleep	TX	RX	TX Power	Sensitivity	PCB Size	Released	Interfacing	Firmware options
Anaren	A2530R24A	CC2530	32 MHz; 8-bit 8051	8 kB	256 kB	Printed Trace	1 μA	34 mA	25 mA	4 dBm	-90 dBm	11 mm × 19 mm	July, 2012	UART, SPI	AIR-ZNP, based on TI Z-Stack
Anaren	A2530R24C	CC2530	32 MHz; 8-bit 8051	8 kB	256 kB	U.FL connector	1 μA	34 mA	25 mA	4 dBm	-90 dBm	11 mm × 19 mm	July, 2012	UART, SPI	AIR-ZNP, based on TI Z-Stack
Anaren	A2530E24A	CC2530	32 MHz; 8-bit 8051	8 kB	256 kB	Printed Trace	1 μA	130 mA	28 mA	15 dBm	-95 dBm	11 mm × 19 mm	July, 2012	UART, SPI	AIR-ZNP, based on TI Z-Stack
Anaren	A2530E24C	CC2530	32 MHz; 8-bit 8051	8 kB	256 kB	U.FL connector	1 μA	106 mA	28 mA	13 dBm	-95 dBm	11 mm × 19 mm	July, 2012	UART, SPI	AIR-ZNP, based on TI Z-Stack
Atmel	ZigBit 2.4 GHz (ATZB-24-B0)	AT86RF230	8-bit ATmega; 1281v	8 kB	128 kB	RF output	< 6 μA	18 mA	19 mA	-17 dBm to 3 dBm	-101 dBm	18.8 mm × 13.5 mm × 2.0 mm	2009	UART, USART, SPI, I²C, JTAG	BitCloud - Zigbee PRO, Wireless MCU Software, BitCloud stack, SerialNet, OpenMAC
Atmel	ZigBit 2.4 GHz (ATZB-24-A2)	AT86RF230	8-bit ATmega; 1281v	8 kB	128 kB	balanced dual chip antenna	< 6 μA	18 mA	19 mA	-17 dBm to 3 dBm	-101 dBm	24 mm × 13.5 mm × 2.0 mm	2009	UART, USART, SPI, I²C, JTAG	BitCloud - Zigbee PRO, Wireless MCU Software, BitCloud stack, SerialNet, OpenMAC
Atmel	ZigBit 2.4 GHz Amplified (ATZB-A24-U0)	AT86RF230	8-bit ATmega; 1281v	8 kB	128 kB	RF output	< 6 μA	50 mA	23 mA	Up to 20 dBm	-104 dBm	38 mm × 13.5 mm × 2.0 mm	2009	UART, USART, SPI, I²C, JTAG	BitCloud - Zigbee PRO, Wireless MCU Software, BitCloud stack, SerialNet, OpenMAC
Atmel	ZigBit 2.4 GHz Amplified (ATZB-A24-UFL)	AT86RF230	8-bit ATmega; 1281v	8 kB	128 kB	U.FL connector	< 6 μA	50 mA	23 mA	Up to 20 dBm	-104 dBm	38 mm × 13.5 mm × 2.0 mm	2009	UART, USART, SPI, I²C, JTAG	BitCloud - Zigbee PRO, Wireless MCU Software, BitCloud stack, SerialNet, OpenMAC
Atmel	ZigBit 700/800/900 MHz (ATZB-900-B0)	AT86RF212	8-bit ATmega; 1281v	8 kB	128 kB	RF output	< 6 μA	26 mA	11 mA	Up to 11 dBm	–110 dBm	24 mm × 13.5 mm × 2.8 mm	2009	UART, USART, SPI, I²C, JTAG	BitCloud - Zigbee PRO, Wireless MCU Software, BitCloud stack, SerialNet, OpenMAC
California Eastern Laboratories	ZICM357SP2	EM357	32 bit, ARM Cortex -M3	12 kB	192 kB	PCB Trace Antenna or RF Port for External Antenna	1 μA	58 mA	34 mA	20 dBm	–103 dBm	23.9 mm × 16.6 mm	Apr, 2012	UART, SPI, TWI	Zigbee PRO stack: EmberZNet PRO
California Eastern Laboratories	ZICM357SP0	EM357	32 bit, ARM Cortex -M3	12 kB	192 kB	PCB Trace Antenna or RF Port for External Antenna	1 μA	31 mA	30 mA	8 dBm	–100 dBm	23.9 mm × 16.6 mm	Apr, 2012	UART, SPI, TWI	Zigbee PRO stack: EmberZNet PRO
California Eastern Laboratories	ZICM3588SP0	SiLabs EM3588	32 bit, ARM Cortex -M3	64 kB	512 kB	PCB Trace Antenna or U.FL connector	2.4 μA	44 mA	30 mA	8 dBm	–100 dBm	23.9 mm × 16.6 mm	Mar, 2014	UART, SPI, I²S	CEL Zigbee Stack; Synapse SNAP Stack
Digi International	Series 1 XBee	Freescale MC13193	8-bit 689S08A HCS08	4 kB	60 kB	integrated Whip, chip or U.FL connector, RPSMA connector	10 μA, 50 μA	45 mA	50 mA	0 dBm	–92 dBm	24.38 mm × 27.61 mm	Dec, 2006	UART	Zigbee stack
Digi International	Series 1 XBee-PRO	Freescale MC13193	8-bit 689S08A HCS08	4 kB	60 kB	integrated Whip, chip or U.FL connector, RPSMA connector	10 μA, 50 μA	250 mA, 340 mA, 180 mA	55 mA	18 dBm, 10 dBm	–100 dBm	24.38 mm × 32.94 mm	Dec, 2006	UART	Zigbee stack
Digi International	Series 2 XBee ZB	Ember (now Silicon Labs) EM250	16-bit 12 MHz; RISC	5 kB	128 kB	integrated Whip, chip or U.FL connector, RPSMA connector	1 μA	40 mA, 35 mA	40 mA, 38 mA	3 dBm, 1 dBm	–96 dBm, –95 dBm	24.38 mm × 27.61 mm	Apr, 2008	UART	Ember ZNet
Digi International	Series 2 XBee-PRO ZB	Ember (now Silicon Labs) EM250	16-bit 12 MHz; RISC	5 kB	128 kB	integrated Whip, chip or U.FL connector, RPSMA connector	10 μA	295 mA, 170 mA	45 mA	17 dBm, 10 dBm	–102 dBm	24.38 mm × 32.94 mm	Apr, 2008	UART	Ember ZNet
Dresden elektronik	deRFmega128-22M00 2.4 GHz	ATmega128RFA1	8-bit ATmega	16 kB	128 kB	Chip ceramic antenna	< 1 μA	18 mA	18 mA	+3 dBm	-98 dBm	23.6 mm × 13.2 mm × 3.0 mm	2012	JTAG, UART, I²C, ADC, SPI, GPIO	MAC stack Zigbee (BitCloud); 6LoWPAN; Atmel
Dresden elektronik	deRFmega128-22M10 2.4 GHz	ATmega128RFA1	8-bit ATmega	16 kB	128 kB	RF pads	< 1 μA	18 mA	18 mA	+3 dBm	-98 dBm	19.0 mm × 13.2 mm × 3.0 mm	2012	JTAG, UART, I²C, ADC, SPI, GPIO	MAC stack Zigbee (BitCloud); 6LoWPAN; Atmel
Dresden elektronik	deRFmega128-22M12 2.4 GHz	ATmega128RFA1	8-bit ATmega	16 kB	128 kB	RF pads	< 1 μA	198 mA	22 mA	+22 dBm	–105 dBm	21.5 mm × 13.2 mm × 3.0 mm	2012	JTAG, UART, I²C, ADC, SPI, GPIO	MAC stack Zigbee (BitCloud); 6LoWPAN; Atmel
Dresden elektronik	deRFmega256-23M00 2.4 GHz	ATmega256RFR2	8-bit ATmega	32 kB	256 kB	Chip ceramic antenna	< 1 μA	19 mA	11 mA	+3.5 dBm	-98 dBm	23.6 mm × 13.2 mm × 3.0 mm	2013	JTAG, UART, I²C, ADC, SPI, GPIO	MAC stack Zigbee (BitCloud); 6LoWPAN; Atmel
Dresden elektronik	deRFmega256-23M10 2.4 GHz	ATmega256RFR2	8-bit ATmega	32 kB	256 kB	RF pads	< 1 μA	19 mA	11 mA	+3.5 dBm	-98 dBm	19.0 mm × 13.2 mm × 3.0 mm	2013	JTAG, UART, I²C, ADC, SPI, GPIO	MAC stack Zigbee (BitCloud); 6LoWPAN; Atmel
Dresden elektronik	deRFmega256-23M12 2.4 GHz	ATmega256RFR2	8-bit ATmega	32 kB	256 kB	RF pads	< 1 μA	233 mA	17 mA	23 dBm	–104 dBm	21.5 mm × 13.2 mm × 3.0 mm	2013	JTAG, UART, I²C, ADC, SPI, GPIO	MAC stack Zigbee (BitCloud); 6LoWPAN; Atmel
Dresden elektronik	deRFsam3-23M10-2 2.4 GHz	ATSAM3S4A; AT86RF232	32-bit ARM Cortex -M3	48 kB	256 kB	RF pads	< 6 μA	45 mA	41 mA	+3 dBm	-100 dBm	21.5 mm × 13.2 mm × 3.0 mm	2013	JTAG, UART, I²C, ADC, SPI, GPIO, USB	MAC stack Zigbee (BitCloud); 6LoWPAN; Atmel
Dresden elektronik	deRFsam3-13M10 868, 915 MHz	ATSAM3S4A; AT86RF212	32-bit ARM Cortex -M3	48 kB	256 kB	RF pads	< 6 μA	50 mA	37 mA	+5 or +10 dBm	–110 dBm	21.5 mm × 13.2 mm × 3.0 mm	2013	JTAG, UART, I²C, ADC, SPI, GPIO, USB	MAC stack Zigbee (BitCloud); 6LoWPAN; Atmel
Dresden elektronik	deRFusb-23E00 2.4 GHz deRFusb-23E06 2.4 GHz	ATSAM3S4B; AT86RF231	32-bit ARM Cortex -M3	48 kB	256 kB	Chip ceramic antenna	32 mA	51 mA	45 mA	+3 dBm	-97 dBm	71.0 mm × 23.0 mm × 8.7 mm	2012	USB, optional: JTAG, Debug	MAC stack Zigbee (BitCloud); 6LoWPAN; Atmel
Dresden elektronik	deRFusb-23E00 JTAG 2.4 GHz deRFusb-23E06 JTAG 2.4 GHz	ATSAM3S4B; AT86RF231	32-bit ARM Cortex -M3	48 kB	256 kB	Chip ceramic antenna	32 mA	51 mA	45 mA	+3 dBm	-97 dBm	63.5 mm × 19.0 mm × 9.5 mm	2012	USB, JTAG, Debug	MAC stack Zigbee (BitCloud); 6LoWPAN; Atmel
Dresden elektronik	deRFusb-13E00 868, 915 MHz deRFusb-13E06 868, 915 MHz	ATSAM3S4B br> AT86RF212	32-bit ARM Cortex -M3	48 kB	256 kB	Chip ceramic antenna	32 mA	51 mA	45 mA	+9 dBm	-106 dBm	71.0 mm × 23.0 mm × 8.7 mm	2012	USB, optional: JTAG, Debug	MAC stack Zigbee (BitCloud); 6LoWPAN; Atmel
Dresden elektronik	deRFusb-13E00 JTAG 868, 915 MHz deRFusb-13E06 JTAG 868, 915 MHz	ATSAM3S4B br> AT86RF212	32-bit ARM Cortex -M3	48 kB	256 kB	Chip ceramic antenna	32 mA	51 mA	45 mA	+9 dBm	-106 dBm	63.5 mm × 19.0 mm × 9.5 mm	2012	USB, JTAG, Debug	MAC stack Zigbee (BitCloud); 6LoWPAN; Atmel
Embit	EMB-WMB169PA, 169 MHz	MSP430F534x	16 bit MSP430	10 kB / 8 kB / 6 kB	128 kB / 96 kB / 64 kB	RF Pads, U.FL Connector	<2 μA	57 mA@ +15dBm	27 mA (full sens.)	up to 30 dBm	-122 dBm	29 mm × 22 mm	2012	UART, SPI, JTAG	MSP430F534x
Embit	EMB-WMB868, 868 MHz	MSP430F534x	16 bit MSP430	10 kB / 8 kB / 6 kB	128 kB / 96 kB / 64 kB	RF Pads, U.FL Connector	<2 μA	57 mA@ +15dBm	27 mA (full sens.)	15 dBm	-122 dBm	29 mm × 22 mm	2012	UART, SPI, JTAG	Wireless M-Bus stack
Embit	EMB-Z2530PA, 2.4 GHz	CC2530	8 bit 8051	8 kB	256 kB	PCB Antenna, U.FL Connector, Wire Antenna opt	<1.1 μA	135 mA@ +20dBm	28 mA	20 dBm	-100 dBm	29 mm × 22 mm	2011	UART, SPI, JTAG	TIMAC (IEEE 802.15.4), ZStack (Zigbee)
Embit	EMB-ZRF212B, 868 MHz, 915 MHz	ATxmega128D3	8/16 bit AVR XMEGA	8 kB	128 kB	Ceramic Antenna, U.FL Connector, RF pads	1.3 μA	17 mA@ +5dBm	10 mA	10 dBm	–110 dBm	29 mm × 22 mm	2013	UART, SPI, JTAG	Atmel Lightweight Mesh, Atmel MAC (IEEE 802.15.4), Atmel BitCloud (Zigbee PRO)
Embit	EMB-ZRF231PA, 2.4 GHz	ATxmega256A3U	8/16 bit AVR XMEGA	16 kB	256 kB	PCB Antenna, U.FL Connector, RF pads	<1.1 μA	132 mA@ +20dBm	24 mA	20 dBm	-105 dBm	29 mm x 22 mm	2011	UART, SPI, JTAG	Atmel Lightweight Mesh, [Atmel MAC (IEEE 802.15.4), Atmel BitCloud (Zigbee PRO)
FlexiPanel Ltd	Pixie	Texas Instruments CC2420	PIC18LF4620	4 kB	64 kB	integral	2 μA	25 mA		0 dBm			Mar, 2008	UART, SPI	Microchip Zigbee
FlexiPanel Ltd	Pixie Lite	Texas Instruments CC2420	PIC18LF2520	1.5 kB	32 kB	integral	2 μA	25 mA		0 dBm			Mar, 2008	UART, SPI	Microchip Zigbee
Kirale Technologies	KTWM102-11	Microchip ATSAMR21E19A	32-bit ARM Cortex -M0+	32 kB	256 kB + 512 kB	on-board chip	5 μA	17 mA	19 mA	4 dBm	-104 dBm	16.6 mm × 11.4 mm × 2.2 mm	2018	UART, USB, JTAG	KiNOS Thread Certified Stack; Atmel
Kirale Technologies	KTWM102-21	Microchip ATSAMR21E19A	32-bit ARM Cortex -M0+	32 kB	256 kB + 512 kB	W.FL connector	5 μA	17 mA	19 mA	4 dBm	-104 dBm	16.6 mm × 11.4 mm × 2.2 mm	2018	UART, USB, JTAG	KiNOS Thread Certified Stack; Atmel
MMB Networks	Z357PA40	Ember (now Silicon Labs) EM357	32-bit ARM Cortex; M3	12 kB	192 kB on-chip, 512 kB on-board	U.FL, on-board chip ceramic	0.65 μA	175 mA at 20 dBm TX power	32 mA	20 dBm max., software programmable	-106 dBm	34.2 mm × 15 mm × 2.88 mm	2015	UART and SPI	Ember's (now Silicon Labs'); EmberZNetPRO with MMB's; RapidConnect family of firmware
NXP	JN5168-001-M00	JN5168	32 MHz; 32-bit RISC	32 kB	256 kB	on board	0.15 μA	15 mA	17 mA	2.5 dBm	-95 dBm	16 mm × 30 mm	2013	UART, SPI	JenNet stack Zigbee stack
NXP	JN5168-001-M03	JN5168	32 MHz; 32-bit RISC	32 kB	256 kB	U.FL connector	0.15 μA	15 mA	17 mA	2.5 dBm	-95 dBm	16 mm × 30 mm	2013	UART, SPI	JenNet stack Zigbee stack
NXP	JN5168-001-M05	JN5168	32 MHz; 32-bit RISC	32 kB	256 kB	U.FL connector	0.15 μA	35 mA	22 mA	9.5 dBm	-96 dBm	16 mm x30 mm	2013	UART, SPI	JenNet stack Zigbee stack
NXP	JN5168-001-M06	JN5168	32 MHz; 32-bit RISC	32 kB	256 kB	U.FL connector	0.15 μA	175 mA	22 mA	22 dBm	-100 dBm	16 mm x30 mm	2013	UART, SPI	JenNet stack Zigbee stack
Control Data Systems	VersaNode 210	MC13224V	32-bit ARM7	96 kB	128 kB	MMCX Connector	15 μA	60 mA	21 mA	10 dBm	-98 dBm	20 mm × 25 mm	2009	UART, SPI	Control Data Systems ISA100.11a
Panasonic	PAN4555	MC1321x	8-bit MC9S08GT HC08	4 kB	60 kB	RF out or ceramic antenna	0.25 μA, 1.9 μA, 36 μA, 1.6 mA	36.5 mA	37 mA	–4 dBm, 0 dBm	–92 dBm	12.2 mm × 16.4 mm × 2.2 mm	2008	UART, SPI	Freescale Beestack [Synapse SNAP Stack
Panasonic	PAN4561	MC13213	8-bit MC9S08GT HC08	4 kB	60 kB	SMD RF out, ceramic antenna or U.FL	1.6 mA, 50 μA, 16 μA, 2 μA	202 mA	45 mA	20 dBm	–105 dBm	35 mm × 15 mm	Jan, 2009	UART, I²C	Freescale Beestack [Synapse SNAP Stack
Panasonic	PAN4570	Ember (now Silicon Labs) EM250	16-bit 12 MHz; RISC	5 kB	128 kB	SMD RF out, ceramic antenna or U.FL	1 μA, 1.5 μA	35.5 mA, 41.5 mA, 28 mA	35.5 mA, 37.5 mA	3 dBm, 5 dBm, –32 dBm	–97 dBm	26.5 mm × 20 mm × 2.8 mm	2006	UART, SPI, I²C	Ember (now Silicon Labs) EM250
Radiocrafts	RC2200	Texas Instruments CC2420	8-bit ATmega128	4 kB	128 kB	integrated, MMCX connector or RF on pin connector	23 μA, 1.3 μA	27 mA	30 mA	0 dBm	-94 dBm	16.5 mm × 29.2 mm × 3.5 mm	2008	UART, SPI, JTAG, ISP	Texas Instruments Z-stack or any third-party Zigbee stack
Radiocrafts	RC2201	Texas Instruments CC2420	8-bit ATmega128	8 kB	128 kB	integrated, MMCX connector or RF on pin connector	1.3 μA	27 mA	30 mA	0 dBm	-94 dBm	16.5 mm × 29.2 mm × 3.5 mm	2008	UART, SPI, JTAG, ISP	Texas Instruments Z-stack or any third-party Zigbee stack
Radiocrafts	RC2202	Texas Instruments CC2420	8-bit ATmega128	2 kB	32 kB	integrated, MMCX connector or RF on pin connector	1.3 μA	23 mA	26 mA	0 dBm	-94 dBm	16.5 mm × 29.2 mm × 3.5 mm	2008	UART, SPI, JTAG, ISP	Texas Instruments Z-stack or any third-party Zigbee stack
Radiocrafts	RC2204	Texas Instruments CC2420	8-bit ATmega128	4 kB	64 kB	integrated, MMCX connector or RF on pin connector	23 μA, 1.3 μA	27 mA	30 mA	0 dBm	-94 dBm	16.5 mm × 29.2 mm × 3.5 mm	2008	UART, SPI, JTAG, ISP	Texas Instruments Z-stack or any third-party Zigbee stack
Radiocrafts	RC2201HP	Texas Instruments CC2420	8-bit ATmega1281	8 kB	128 kB	integrated or RF-on-pin connector	40 μA, 2 μA	140 mA	28 mA	17 dBm	-92 dBm	16.5 mm × 35.6 mm × 3.5 mm	Jan 2008	UART, SPI, JTAG, ISP	Texas Instruments Z-stack or any third-party Zigbee stack
Radiocrafts	RC2300	Texas Instruments CC2430 (CC2431 for location engine option)	8-bit 8051	8 kB	128 kB	integrated or RF-on-pin connector	300 μA, 0.9 μA, 0.6 μA	27 mA	27 mA	0 dBm	-92 dBm	12.7 mm × 25.4 mm × 2.5 mm	Jul 2008	UART, SPI, proprietary serial debugging interface	Texas Instruments Z-stack or any third-party Zigbee stack
Radiocrafts	RC2301	Texas Instruments CC2430 (CC2431 for location engine option)	8-bit 8051	8 kB	128 kB	integrated or RF-on-pin connector	300 μA, 0.9 μA, 0.6 μA	27 mA	27 mA	0 dBm	-92 dBm	12.7 mm × 25.4 mm × 2.5 mm	Jul 2008	UART, SPI, proprietary serial debugging interface	Texas Instruments Z-stack or any third-party Zigbee stack
Radiocrafts	RC2302	Texas Instruments CC2430 (CC2431 for location engine option)	8-bit 8051	8 kB	32 kB	integrated or RF-on-pin connector	300 μA, 0.9 μA, 0.6 μA	27 mA	27 mA	0 dBm	-92 dBm	12.7 mm × 25.4 mm × 2.5 mm	Jul 2008	UART, SPI, proprietary serial debugging interface	Texas Instruments Z-stack or any third-party Zigbee stack
Radiocrafts	RC2304	Texas Instruments CC2430 (CC2431 for location engine option)	8-bit 8051	8 kB	64 kB	integrated or RF-on-pin connector	300 μA, 0.9 μA, 0.6 μA	27 mA	27 mA	0 dBm	-92 dBm	12.7 mm × 25.4 mm × 2.5 mm	Jul 2008	UART, SPI, proprietary serial debugging interface	Texas Instruments Z-stack or any third-party Zigbee stack
Monolithics	ZMN2405	Texas Instruments CC2430	8-bit 8051	8 kB	128 kB	RFIO pad	3 μA	28 mA	27 mA	0 dBm	-92 dBm	30.5 mm × 21.2 mm	2008	UART, SPI,	Zigbee stack, RFM's CSM standard module application profile
Monolithics	ZMN2430	Texas Instruments CC2430	8-bit 8051	8 kB	128 kB	RFIO pad	3 μA	28 mA	27 mA	0 dBm	-92 dBm	25 mm × 20.3 mm	2008	UART, SPI,	Zigbee stack, RFM's CSM standard module application profile
Monolithics	ZMN2430A <	Texas Instruments CC2430	8-bit 8051	8 kB	128 kB	built-in	3 μA	28 mA	27 mA	–2 dBm	–90 dBm	25 mm × 26.9 mm	2008	UART, SPI,	Zigbee stack, RFM's CSM standard module application profile
Monolithics	ZMN2405HP	Texas Instruments CC2430	8-bit 8051	8 kB	128 kB	RFIO pad	3 μA	130 mA	33 mA	17 dBm	-95 dBm	40.6 mm × 21.2 mm	2008	UART, SPI,	Zigbee stack, RFM's CSM standard module application profile
Monolithics	ZMN2405HPA	Texas Instruments CC2430	8-bit 8051	8 kB	128 kB	built-in	3 μA	130 mA	33 mA	15 dBm	-95 dBm	47 mm × 21.2 mm	2008	UART, SPI,	Zigbee stack, RFM's CSM standard module application profile
Monolithics	ZMN2430HP	Texas Instruments CC2430	8-bit 8051	8 kB	128 kB	RFIO pad	3 μA	130 mA	33 mA	17 dBm	-95 dBm	30.48 mm × 25 mm	2008	UART, SPI,	Zigbee stack, RFM's CSM standard module application profile
Monolithics	ZMN2430HPA	Texas Instruments CC2430	8-bit 8051	8 kB	128 kB	built-in	3 μA	130 mA	33 mA	15 dBm	-95 dBm	36.83 mm × 25 mm	2008	UART, SPI,	Zigbee stack, RFM's CSM standard module application profile
Radios, Inc.	MXR-EM20	Ember 2420	8-bit ATmega128L	4 kB	128 kB	RF on pin	20 μA	17.4 mA	19.7 mA	0 dBm	–94 dBm	25.4 mm × 18.4 mm	Oct; 2005	SPI	Zigbee stack
Synapse	SM220UF1	ATmega128RFA1	8-bit ATmega	16 kB	128 kB	PCB Antenna and U.FL connector	0.4 μA	20 dBm: 150 mA 6 dBm: 55 mA	22 mA	20 dBm	–103 dBm	29.8mm × 19mm	2013	UART, SPI, I²C	Synapse SNAP Stack
[Talon Communications	Oasis	NXP (formerly Freescale) KW22D512V	Cortex-M4	64 kB	512 kB	U.FL, MMCX or edge connect to external trace PIFA	4uA	111 mA	24 mA	20 dBm	-108 dBm	25mm × 20mm × 2.7mm	Feb; 2015	JTAG, UART, I²C, ADC, SPI, GPIO, PWM, USB	SMAC
[Talon Communications	Sierra mangOH IoT	NXP (formerly Freescale) KW22D512V	Cortex-M4	64 kB	512 kB	RP-SMA, Chip	4uA	111 mA	24 mA	20 dBm	-108 dBm	45mm × 22.3mm × 2.7mm	May 2016	JTAG, UART, SPI, GPIO, USB	SMAC
Telegesis Ltd	ETRX2	Ember (now Silicon Labs); EM250	16-bit 12 MHz; RISC	5 kB	128 kB	integrated, U.FL connector or 50Ω pad	1 μA, 1.5 μA	35.5 mA, 41.5 mA, 28 mA	35.5 mA, 37.5 mA	3 dBm, 5 dBm	−94 dBm, −95 dBm, −98 dBm, −99 dBm	37.75 mm × 20.45 mm	2008	SIF, UART, I²C, SPI	Ember ZNet Stack
Telegesis Ltd	ETRX2-PA	Ember (now Silicon Labs); EM250	16-bit 12 MHz; RISC	5 kB	128 kB	integrated, U.FL connector or 50Ω pad	0.8 μA, 1.5 μA, 3 μA, 3.5 μA	56 mA, 63 mA, 106 mA, 120 mA, 121 mA	37 mA	0 dBm, 10 dBm, 18.5 dBm, 17.5 dBm	−92 dBm, −93 dBm, −96 dBm, −97 dBm	37.75 mm × 20.5 mm	2009	SIF, UART, I²C, SPI	Ember ZNet Stack
Telegesis Ltd	ETRX2USB	Ember (now Silicon Labs); EM250	16-bit 12 MHz; RISC	5 kB	128 kB	integrated	32 mA, 27 mA, 26 mA	55 mA, 62 mA	62 mA	3 dBm, 18 dBm			2008	SIF	Ember ZNet Stack
Telegesis Ltd	ETRX351	Silicon Labs (former Ember); EM351	32-bit ARM Cortex -M3; Processor	12 kB	128 kB	Integrated chip antenna or U.FL coaxial connector	<1 μA	31 mA	22 mA	8 dBm	−102 dBm	25 mm × 19 mm	2011		Ember ZNet Stack
Telegesis Ltd	ETRX357[	Silicon Labs (former Ember); EM357	32-bit ARM Cortex -M3; Processor	12 kB	192 kB	Integrated chip antenna or U.FL coaxial connector	<1 μA	31 mA	22 mA	8 dBm	−102 dBm	25 mm × 19 mm	2011		Ember ZNet Stack
Sena Technologies	ProBee-ZE10	Ember (now Silicon Labs); EM250	16-bit 12 MHz; RISC	5 kB	128 kB	Integrated chip, U.FL connector, RPSMA Connector	≤ 2 μA	190 mA	45 mA	20 dBm	–102 dBm	51.7 mm × 23.0 mm × 11.15 mm	2010; Oct	UART	Ember ZNet Stack
Sena Technologies	ProBee-ZE20S DIP/SMD	Ember (now Silicon Labs); EM357	32-bit ARM Cortex -M3; Processor	12 kB	192 kB	Integrated chip, U.FL connector, RPSMA Connector	< 1 μA	33 mA	28 mA	8 dBm	-100 dBm/Max. -102 dBm	SMD Size: 31.6 mm × 18.6 mm, DIP Size: 32.8 mm × 21.0 mm	2011; Oct	UART	Ember ZNet Stack

== List of Zigbee company acquisitions ==
- 2016, Apr - Cypress acquires Broadcom's IoT Business
- 2016, Jan - Silicon Labs acquires Telegesis
- 2016, Jan - Microchip acquires Atmel
- 2015, Dec - NXP acquires Freescale Semiconductor
- 2012, Jul - Murata acquires RF
- 2012, May - Silicon Labs acquires Ember
- 2011, Dec - Linear technology acquires Dust Networks
- 2010, Jul - NXP acquires Jennic
- 2009, Feb - Atmel acquires Meshnetics
- 2008, Nov - Telit acquires One RF technology
- 2007, Aug - Texas Instruments acquires Integrated Circuit Designs
- 2006, Jan - Texas Instruments acquires Chipcon (intention announced 2005–10 but deal completed 2006-01-24)
- 2005, Jan - Chipcon acquires Figure 8

== Other companies manufacturing 802.15.4 ready-to-use modules ==
The following is a list of companies producing modules yet to be added to the table.

- Adaptive Network Solutions (Atmel chipset at 900 MHz)
- Air Micro (RadioPulse chipset)
- Develco
- Develco Products
- Joymax (Jennic chipset)
- LS Research ProFLEX01, SiFLEX02
- Merlin Wireless (Ember chipset)
- Spectec (TI chipset)
- Synapse Wireless
- Telit (TI Chipset, TinyOne 2400MC, ZE50-2.4, ZE60-2.4)
- UConnect (TI Chipset)
- ZMDI (ZMDI chipset at 900 MHz)
