= Time Slotted Channel Hopping =

TSCH
- International standard: IEEE 802.15.4
- Introduced: September 2015
- Industry: Industrial wireless sensor networks

Time Slotted Channel Hopping or Time Synchronized Channel Hopping (TSCH) is a channel access method for shared-medium networks.

TSCH is used by Low-Power devices to communicate using a wireless link. It is designed for low-power and lossy networks (LLNs) and aims at providing a reliable Media access control layer.

TSCH can be seen as a combination of Time-division multiple access and Frequency-division multiple access mechanisms as it uses diversity in time and frequency to provide reliability to the upper network layers.

The TSCH mode was introduced in 2012 as an amendment (IEEE 802.15.4e) to the Medium Access Control (MAC) portion of the IEEE 802.15.4 standard. The amendment was rolled into the IEEE 802.15.4 in 2015.

== Description ==
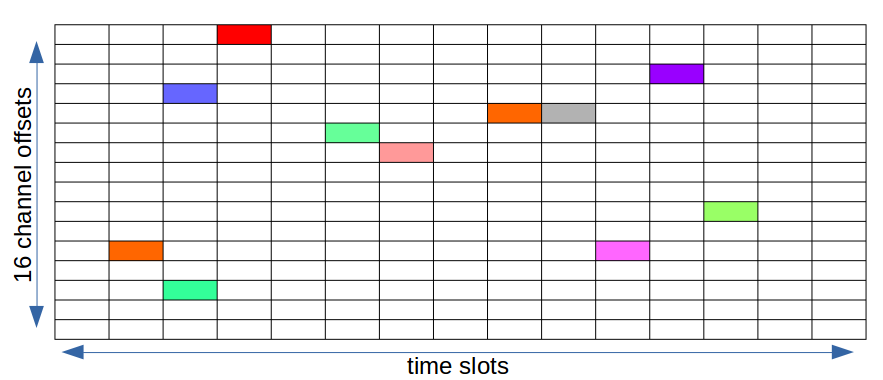
A TSCH slotframe on the 2.4GHz band. Each color represents a layer 2 (MAC) link between two devices.

Wireless communications are often referred as unreliable due to the unpredictability of the wireless medium. While wireless communications bring many advantages (e.g no wires maintenance, costs reduction ...), the lack of reliability slows down the adoption of wireless networks technologies.

TSCH aims at reducing the impact of the wireless medium unpredictability to enable the use of reliable low-power wireless networks. It is very good at saving the nodes' energy because each node shares a schedule, allowing it to know in advance when to turn on or off its radio.

The IEEE 802.15.4 standard uses different frequency bands, and each frequency band is separated in channels. In TSCH, communications are done using those different channels and at different times. However, this standard does not define how to build and maintain the communication schedule. Many works have been proposed to organize the schedule in a centralized or distributed way.

== Channel hopping ==
Let chOf be the channel offset, assigned to a given link. The channel offset, chOf, is translated to a frequency f (i.e. a real channel) using:

$f = F{(ASN + chOf)\,\bmod\,n_{ch}}$

where ASN is the Absolute Slot Number, i.e. the total number of slots that elapsed since the network was deployed. The ASN is incremented at each slot and shared by all devices in the network.

=== Multipath-fading mitigation ===
Multipath propagation can create internal destructive interference of a wireless signal known as multipath fading. This phenomenon can be overcome by shifting the location of the communicating nodes or by switching the communication carrier frequency.

The channel hopping mechanism of TSCH allows to overcome the impact of multipath fading by changing the communication carrier frequency for every transmission.

== Implementations ==
TSCH is implemented in simulation or on real hardware.

Simulation:

- NS2
- OpenWSN

Firmware:

- RIoT
- OpenWSN
- Contiki

== 6TiSCH ==
TSCH is one of the key elements of the 6TiSCH stack as part of the IEEE802.15.4-2015 standard.

== Uses ==
Due to its low power consumption and reliability, TSCH (or its previous versions) is mainly used in Low-Power Wireless Sensor Networks.

Companies are using it in their wireless sensor networks such as Linear Technology and Emerson

== See also ==
- Wireless sensor network
- WirelessHart
- ISA100.11a
- TSMP
