= Nivis =

- Company type: private
- Industry: specialized semiconductors
- Founded: 1998
- Headquarters: Atlanta, Georgia, United States
- Key people: Doug Johns, CEO
- Products: Wireless sensor network devices
- Owner: Lupton Group / Lyndhurst Foundation
- Number of employees: Approximately 50 (2012)
- Website: www.nivis.com

Nivis, LLC is a company that designs and manufactures wireless sensor networks for smart grid and industrial process automation. Target applications include process monitoring, environmental monitoring, power management, security, and the internet of things. The company is headquartered in Atlanta, Georgia, with additional offices in Romania, where much of its technology is developed. The company's product portfolio consists of standards-based wireless communications systems, including radio nodes, routers, management software and a software stack for native communications. Nivis hardware is operated by open source software.

== Company history ==
Nivis was founded in 1998 and purchased in 1999 by the Lupton Group / Lyndhurst Foundation, a Chattanooga, Tennessee based foundation formed by Cartter Lupton who was the son of John Thomas Lupton.

Nivis deployed its first product, a 900MHz proprietary mesh network for environmental monitoring, in 2002. This system consisted of gateways connected in a mesh network communicating over satellite/GPRS with a Network Operations Center in Atlanta, Georgia.

Between 2003 and 2006, Nivis deployed 900 MHz Frequency-Hopping Spread Spectrum (FHSS) proprietary mesh technology with partner in Automatic Meter Reading (AMR).

In 2008, Nivis moved to standards-based technology. The company deployed Direct-Sequence Spread Spectrum (DSSS), 802.15.4 2.4 GHz mesh technology, with partner for an intelligent street light controller. That year, Nivis launched an evaluation kit based on the ISA100.11a standard. Shortly after, Cisco and Nivis demonstrated a 6LoWPAN sensor network and in October the company signed a joint development agreement with Freescale.

In 2009, Nivis launched an ISA100.11a development kit consisting of gateway and end devices, and an ISA 100.11a Wireless Demonstration Project In Operation. In 2010 the Nivis ISA100.11a stack was successfully tested for compliance by the Wireless Compliance Institute (WCI).

In 2011, Nivis launched the WirelessHART development kit. later that year the company was awarded Nivis awarded the FIPS-197 Security Certification for Industrial Wireless Solutions utilizing Advanced Encryption Standard (AES) 128 for encryption. Subsequently, Nivis launched a smart objects networking platform, using 6LoWPAN, 802.15.4g and 802.15.4e, at IPSO Alliance press conference in Santa Clara, CA.

In 2012, Nivis was the only company that supports both the ISA100.11a and WirelessHART standards with a single device; by 2015 the company had several competitors in this field.

== Technology ==
Nivis has specialized in wireless mesh network research and technology, in which no device or connection can be a single point of failure. The technology has several advantages: it uses an architecture which supports a variety of network topologies, allowing the user to choose one appropriate for a specific environments. At start up, devices automatically organize themselves into a multi-hop, layered network, and the nodes organize themselves in layers and form redundant routing paths. If a node fails, the remaining nodes automatically re-route traffic around that node. Each node makes routing decisions locally, so that the network can dynamically adapt to changes in the network by adopting new routes.

The decentralized, wireless networks scale easily and at low cost, and the radio nodes typically communicate on unlicensed frequency bands (for example 2.4 GHz), in a time-slotted network that is able to coexist with other wireless networks that may or may not be based on the same standard.

Nivis supports the Advanced Encryption Standard adopted by the U.S. government and worldwide, as well as FIPS-197 certification, 802.15.4 security level, ISA100.11a MAC and Transport layer security, WirelessHART MAC and Transport layer security, and follow the IPsec standard for securing end-to-end IP communications.
