= Monorail (disambiguation) =

A monorail is a railway in which the track consists of a single rail or a beam.

Monorail may also refer to:

- Monorail camera, a camera whose components are mounted on a rail which allows positional adjustment
- MonoRail (software), an open source web application framework built on top of the ASP.NET platform
- Monorail Inc., a defunct American computer company
- Overhead crane, a type of crane found in industrial environments

== See also ==
- Disney monorail (disambiguation), monorail systems used on Disney properties
- "Marge vs. the Monorail", an episode of The Simpsons
- Rivers State Monorail, a proposed transportation project in Port Harcourt, Rivers State, Nigeria
