= Devlab =

Devlab may refer to:

- DevLab (research alliance), Development Laboratories, a Research Alliance in the Netherlands
- Devlab (album) (2004), the seventh solo album by Canadian musician Devin Townsend
