= MyriaNed =

Wireless sensor network

MyriaNed logo

MyriaNed is a wireless sensor network (WSN) platform developed by DevLab. It uses an epidemic communication style based on standard radio broadcasting. This approach reflects the way humans interact, which is called gossiping. Messages are sent periodically and received by adjoining neighbours. Each message is repeated and duplicated towards all nodes that span the network; it spreads like a virus (hence the term epidemic communication).

This is a very efficient and robust protocol, mainly for two reasons:

- First, the nodes do not need to know who is in their neighbourhood at the time of sending a message, there is no notion of an a-priori planned Routing, data is just shared instantaneously.
- Second, the network is implicitly reliable since messages may follow different communication routes in parallel. The loss of a message between two nodes does not mean that the data is lost.

Nodes can be added, removed or may be physically moving without the need to reconfigure the network. The GOSSIP protocol is a self-configuring network solution. The network may even be heterogeneous, where several types of nodes communicate different pieces of information with each other at the same time. This is possible due to the fact that no interpretation of the message content is required in order to be able to forward it to other nodes.

Message communication is fully transparent, providing a seamless communication platform, where new functionality can be added later, without the need to change the installed base. Furthermore, MyriaNed is enabled to update the wireless sensor nodes software by means of “over the air” programming of a deployed network.

== Inspiration ==
Traditionally radio communication is organized according to the master-slave philosophy. The way two nodes communicate is point-to-point. A command is sent top-down and a confirmation is sent bottom-up between two hierarchical levels.

However, in biology this is organized differently. For instance adrenaline in the human body works completely different. This message (hormone and neurotransmitter) is sent to different types of cells. Every cell knows what to do with this message (increase heart rate, constrict blood vessels, dilate air passages) and does not sent a confirmation. This is the inspiration for MyriaNed in a nutshell.

Another inspiration is the basic radio broadcasting principle. A radio with an antenna is made to send and receive a message to and from every direction. Implicitly it is not optimized to perform point-to-point communication. Wires are ideally suitable for that because they always link two devices. Looking at wireless communication, it should be structured in such a way that it uses the potential of radio transmission.

The third inspiration is that of human gossiping. The term is sometimes associated with spreading misinformation of trivial nature but the way information is disseminated is one of the oldest and most common in nature. Information is generated by a source and gossiped to its neighbours. They spread the message to their neighbours, thereby exponentially increasing the number of people familiar with the information.

Together these three inspirations led to the development of the MyriaNed platform. There is no master-slave structure in the network rather each node is hierarchically equal. MyriaNed uses biological routing which is random and independent of the function of the node. Each node decides what to do with a message. Furthermore, it sends the message to all its neighbours thereby using the basic radio communication characteristics.

== Technical overview ==
=== Data dissemination ===
In potential the complete set of information (e.g. sensor values, control data) is available to every node in the network. By using an intelligent strategy, called shared state, this information is stored as a distributed database in the network. Nodes that are newly added to the network can utilize this shared state to instantaneously adapt and contribute to the network functionality.

When it comes to caching the messages there are two scenarios. The first scenario, if a message is new to the receiving node (meaning the data was not received in previous communication rounds), the node will store the message in cache and transmit this message to its own neighbours. Secondly, if the message is old (meaning the data was already received before, i.e. through another neighbour), the message is discarded. If the cache is full, different strategies can be employed in order to make room for new messages.

=== Interoperability ===
Since there is no top-down structure imposed on the network and data dissemination is transparent, the network is naturally scalable. On the communication level no identification administration is necessary and messages have a standard structure. This makes it possible that a MyriaNed network can scale far beyond the limits of currently available WSN technologies. Also different functionality can be integrated and executed on a single network.

=== Energy consumption ===
In order to reduce the energy consumption of the nodes in the network duty cycling is used. This means that nodes communicate periodically, and go to standby mode in a large part of the period in order to preserve energy. In order to communicate the nodes need to wake up at the same time, therefore they have a built-in synchronization mechanism.

=== Radio communication ===
During radio communication a TDMA (time-division multiple access) scheme is used to overcome collisions during broadcast communication. Current implementations run on 2.4 GHz and 868 MHz radios. The concept of MyriaNed is however not restricted to these frequencies.

=== Topology ===
From the previous characteristics of MyriaNed it can be derived that it uses a true mesh topology. The advantage of such a topology is reliability, and coping with mobility, because of the redundant communication paths in the network.

=== Setup ===
Setup and configuration is kept to a bare minimum because of the bottom-up approach utilized in the self-organizing network. There is no notion of a coordinator or network manager entity compared to technologies such as Zigbee or WirelessHART. This reduces the effort spent on setup and maintenance.

=== Autonomy ===
When MyriaNed is used for specific applications, the ultimate implementation is based on a large set of autonomous devices which make their own autonomous decisions (e.g. controlling actuators) based on the available information that travels through the network by gossiping dissemination. The sum of all individual behaviors of the network nodes reflect the emergent behavior of the system as a whole, which is the systems application.

=== Costs ===
MyriaNed has an extremely small stack, uses low calculation power and does not need a large amount of energy. Therefore, it can be run on a simple microcontroller and small sized battery. This makes the costs of a single node very low.

DevLab members work with a single chip solution in which the radio and microcontroller are integrated. This chip with an attached battery is smaller than a 2 euro coin.

Installation and expansion of networks using the MyriaNed protocol is very cost efficient as well. There is no need for addressing and the information in the network is synchronized over time with added nodes. Therefore, no additional costs have to be made (like gateways/setup/bridges) in order to install or expand the network.

== Applications ==
Because of the structure of MyriaNed there is no need for different profiles for market applications. Different applications can run next to each other without interfering. Instead they will only help each other by increasing the density of the network. Every DevLab member is free to use MyriaNed in whatever market they want. This has resulted in many interoperable devices in completely different applications.

Application area	Example
Building automation	Leds control wireless Heat control system
Transportation	Wireless bicycle brake , Train seatreservation system
Elderly care	Ambient Living with Embedded Networks
Event	Soundgadget , Social WSN
Agriculture	Observation of horticulture in greenhouses

== Present implementations ==
Chess Wise, one of the companies behind DEVLAB, used the MyriaNED technology as an early base for Mymesh, their network protocol. This technology is used to connect, control and analyze thousands of devices simultaneously within demanding environments.

== See also ==
- Bluetooth
- Wi-Fi
- WirelessHART
- DASH7
- EnOcean
- Z-Wave
