= TTM Technologies =

American printed circuit board manufacturer

TTM Technologies, Inc.
- Type: Public
- Traded as: Nasdaq: TTMI; S&P 400 component
- Industry: Electronics
- Founded: 1998; 28 years ago in Redmond, Washington, U.S.
- Founder: Kent Alder
- Headquarters: Santa Ana, California, U.S.
- Key people: Edwin Roks (President and CEO); James P. Walsh (Executive Vice President and COO)
- Products: Printed circuit boards RF components
- Revenue: ▼US$2.23 billion (2023)
- Operating income: ▼US$42.3 million (2023)
- Net income: ▼US$–18.7 million (2023)
- Number of employees: 15,800 (2023)
- Website: ttm.com

TTM Technologies, Inc. is an American printed circuit board (PCB) manufacturer headquartered in Santa Ana, California. Founded in 1998, the company is one of the top five PCB manufacturers in the world and the largest in North America, and the largest supplier of PCBs to the U.S. military. TTM serves customers in industries including aerospace and defense, medical, industrial, automotive, computing, and networking.

== History ==
TTM Technologies, Inc. was founded in 1998 by Kent Alder in Redmond, Washington, via an acquisition of Pacific Circuits, Inc., and moved to Santa Ana, California, in 1999, after acquiring Power Circuits, Inc. Alder was previously the president of Lundahl Astro Circuits, Inc. in Logan, Utah, from 1987, and president and CEO of its successor ElectroStar, Inc. from 1994. After ElectroStar was acquired by the Tyco Printed Circuit Group in 1996, Alder served as that company's vice president before departing to found TTM.

TTM's original business was manufacturing printed circuit boards (PCBs) used in routers, switches, servers and memory modules, and its customers included General Electric, Motorola, and Solectron. In 2000, the company made its initial public offering (IPO) on the Nasdaq stock exchange. In 2002, TTM acquired Honeywell Advanced Circuits, Inc. for US$2 million, gaining a 281,000-square-foot (26,100 m^{2}) factory in Chippewa Falls, Wisconsin (the largest PCB manufacturing facility in the country) and adding customers including Cisco, Sun Microsystems, and IBM. In 2006, TTM acquired the Tyco Printed Circuit Group for $226 million, expanding its business to specialized PCBs geared to the aerospace and defense sectors.

In 2010, TTM acquired the Hong Kong–headquartered Meadville Printed Circuit Group for $521 million, which expanded the company's footprint in Asia and extended its business to PCBs used in smartphones and tablets. In 2013, Tom Edman succeeded Alder as president of TTM, and in 2014 also succeeded him as CEO on Alder's retirement. In 2015, the company acquired Viasystems Group, Inc. for $950 million, marking its entry into the automotive industry and further expanding its presence in aerospace and defense. In 2018, TTM acquired Anaren, Inc. for $775 million, expanding to high-frequency radio and microwave microelectronics used in the space, defense, and telecommunications industries.

In 2019, TTM acquired intellectual property assets from i3 Electronics, Inc., citing a particular interest in i3's technology enabling very fine printed lines and spacing down to 25 microns. In 2020, TTM sold its mobile device business unit, comprising four facilities in China, to AKM Meadville Electronics (Xiamen) Co., Ltd., for $550 million. Also in 2020, TTM closed down its commercial assembly business unit, comprising three facilities in China. In 2022, TTM acquired Telephonics Corporation from Griffon Corporation for $330 million, further expanding its operations in aerospace and defense.

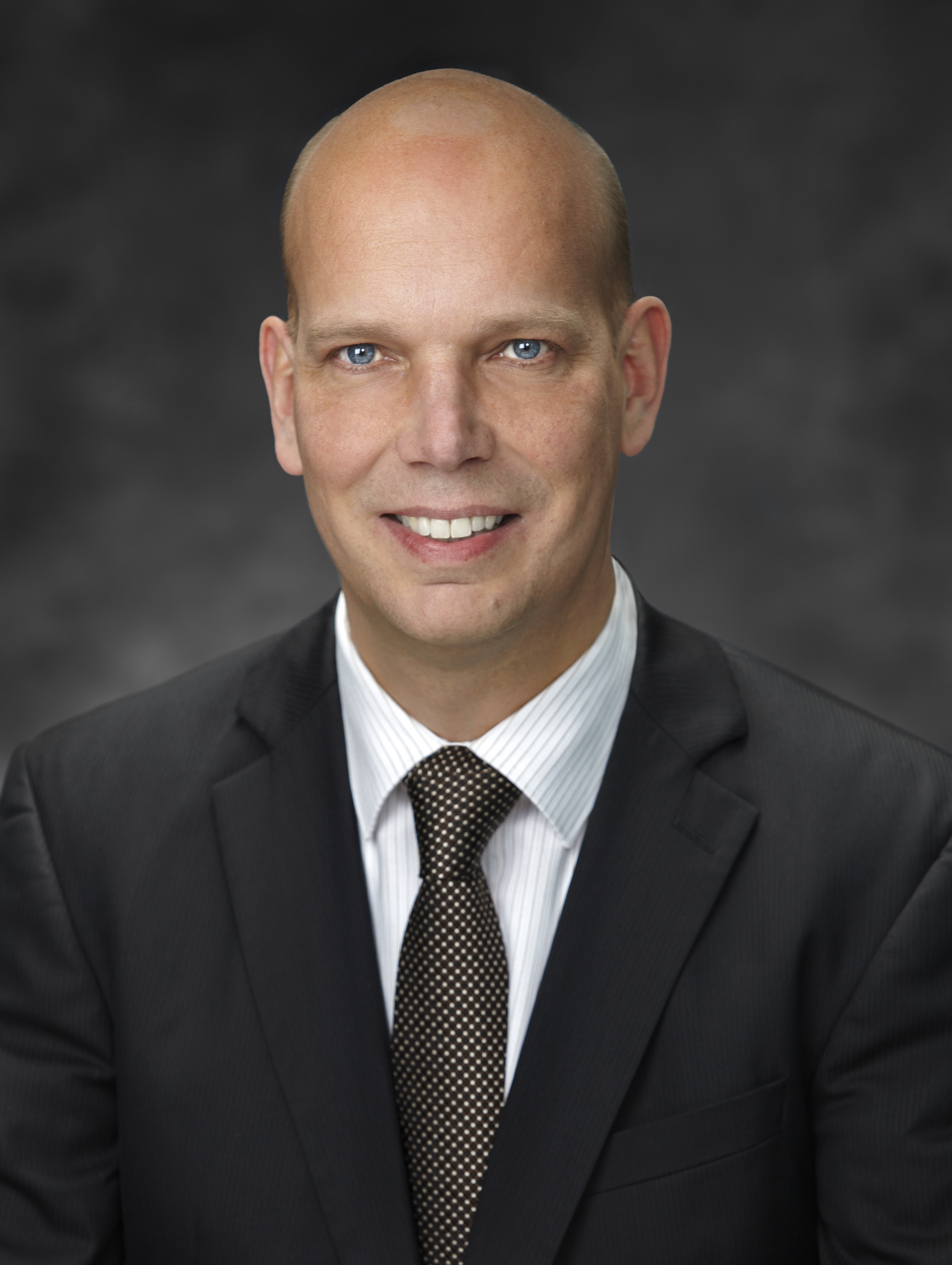
Edwin Roks — President and CEO of TTM Technologies

== Operations ==
TTM Technologies manufactures PCBs and radio-frequency and specialty (RF&S) components for industries including aerospace and defense (45% of revenue in 2023); medical and industrial (17%); automotive (16%); data center computing (14%); and networking (8%). The company is one of the world's top five PCB manufacturers by revenue ($2.23 billion in 2023), and the largest PCB manufacturer in North America. As of 2017, TTM was also the largest supplier of PCBs to the U.S. military, primarily as a subcontractor. In 2020, TTM had about 1,600 customers, and its five largest original equipment manufacturer customers (not in order) were Huawei, Lockheed Martin, Northrop Grumman, Raytheon, and Bosch. In 2015, the company's five largest customers were Apple, Cisco, Huawei, Juniper Networks, and Bosch, and in 2010 they were Apple, Cisco, Ericsson, Huawei, and IBM.

As of 2026, the company employs about 15,800 people and operates facilities across North America and Asia, including:

- Corporate offices in Santa Ana, California; Hong Kong; Bengaluru, India; Kanagawa, Japan; St. Louis, Missouri; and Taoyuan, Taiwan.
- A&D Sector facilities in Chippewa Falls, Wisconsin; Denver, Colorado; Farmingdale, New York; Forest Grove, Oregon; North Jackson, Ohio; Salem, New Hampshire; San Diego, California; Santa Ana, California; Stafford, Connecticut; Stafford Springs, Connecticut; Sterling, Virginia; and Syracuse, New York.
- Commercial Sector facilities in Logan, Utah; San Jose, California; Toronto, Ontario; Dongguan, Guangzhou, Huiyang, Suzhou, and Zhongshan, China; Penang, Malaysia; and Küssnacht, Switzerland.
- Engineering centers in Chippewa Falls, Guangzhou, and Binghamton, New York.
