= Monorail Inc. =

American computer manufacturer (1995–2005)

Monorail Computer Corporation
- Logo used from 1998 to 2003
- Formerly: Monorail Inc. (1995–1998)
- Type: Private
- Industry: Computer hardware
- Founded: November 2, 1995; 30 years ago
- Founder: Doug Johns; David Hocker; Nicholas Forlenza
- Defunct: July 9, 2005; 21 years ago
- Fate: Dissolved
- Headquarters: Marietta, Georgia, U.S.
- Key people: Andrew Watson, VP of marketing
- Number of employees: 40 (1996)
- Website: monorail.com (archived)

Monorail Inc., later the Monorail Computer Corporation, was an American computer company founded in 1995 in Marietta, Georgia, by former Compaq executive Doug Johns.

The company produced the Monorail PC, which was an all-in-one computer with a flat-panel LCD. It predated Apple's iMac G4 by about five years.

According to Bloomberg Businessweek, the company "helped spawn a revolution in personal computers ... [selling] machines for as little as $999 in an effort to woo new price-sensitive users", to which larger manufacturers like Compaq and Packard Bell NEC followed suit.

Monorail ceased operations in July 2005.

== History ==
=== Foundation (1995–1996) ===
Logo used from 1995 to 1998

Principal founder H. Douglas "Doug" Johns (born c. 1948) was previously the president of Compaq's personal computer division. He left in 1993, citing long hours, and took a sabbatical while holding his stock options in Compaq. Johns observed the computer industry from a distance and observed that the companies earning the most in sales were intelligent with their packaging and had their logistics in order. Johns felt that Compaq were opposites in the latter regard: "It seemed like we always had monitors in Singapore when we needed them in Europe or too many computers in Germany when we needed them in Italy". Johns felt that he could compete with Dell and Gateway 2000 in the build-to-order market and sold $2 million worth of Compaq's shares to put into the formation of Monorail in 1995.

Johns scouted two of his colleagues from Compaq, David Hocker and Nicholas Forlenza, to co-found the company with him. The core marketing strategy the three laid out before production of any computers began was to combine the slim inventory of Gateway and Dell (due to their build-to-order nature) with the trust afforded by tangible goods on the retail floor, as Compaq had managed. This marriage of approaches was dubbed "Dellpaq" by Andrew Watson, Monorail's VP of marketing in 1997, and was to be further augmented with a sub-$1000 price, to entice first-time computer buyers. The co-founders soon hired other technology companies to manage the company and design its products. Most of Monorail's initial executive roster included employees from Texas Instruments, Global Village, and Oracle. The California-based NameLab was hired to conjure the Monorail trademark.

As Johns felt that packaging optimization was crucial, he and his colleagues built the prototype for an all-in-one computer that fit within a volume of 48.26 by 48.26 by 24.13 cm (19.00 by 19.00 by 9.50 in), per FedEx's specification for the optimal box size for a package weighing between 6.75 to 11.25 kg (14.9 to 24.8 lb). As a box of that size and weight capacity could not remotely fit a cathode-ray tube monitor – a display technology common for the time—Johns fit the computer with a flat panel liquid-crystal display borrowed from a laptop. The result was the Monorail PC, a system roughly 80 percent the size of a desktop computer but twice as heavy as a laptop. Phelps Technologies and FedEx were hired for manufacturing and distribution respectively. Meanwhile, James Clarke, a former SunTrust Banks executive whom Johns hired as chief financial officer, negotiated a deal with his former employer to handle accounts receivable. Shortly before the computer's release, CompUSA agreed to sell the Monorail PC in fall 1996; merchandising chief Larry Mondry was attracted by the computer's form factor, while Monorail promised to minimize inventory.

Phelps, a metal press based in Kansas City, entered the computer manufacturing business in the early 1990s assembling Compaq's Prolinea systems, later earning contract work from Dell, Xerox, AT&T, and IBM. The Monorail PC was the first computer Phelps manufactured from the ground up. Phelps in turn hired Complex Plastics of Boulder, Colorado, for injection molded PC/ABS plastic parts and Colorado Electronic Hardware for electronic components. Phelps additionally commissioned NMB Technologies to manufacture the computer's keyboard. Monorail erstwhile sourced the LCD from Sharp, a 10.4-in passive-matrix panel. Phelps assembled the Monorail from their 200,000 sq ft factory in Kansas City, in which they employed between 500 and 600 employees. As production ramped up, Phelps added a production line for the Monorail PC in their 60,000 sq ft factory in Houston. Phelps' combined workforce on the Monorail peaked at 1,200 in 1996. In contrast, Monorail's Marietta headquarters were 40 people strong by October that year.

=== Market introduction (1996–1997) ===
External videos
- Overview of a Monorail PC on YouTube (by Lazy Game Reviews)
- Examination of the sixteenth Monorail PC sold on YouTube (by BBISHOPPCM)
- Repair and interior view of the Monorail PC on YouTube (by BBISHOPPCM)
- The Monorail - An All-In-One Windows 95 Computer! (Retrospective) on YouTube (by Michael MJD)
- The Monorail Computer Owner's Kit! - Unboxing and System Restore on YouTube (by Michael MJD)

The Monorail PC was released in late November 1996 at a suggested retail price of $999. A successor model upgrading the Monorail PC's processor from a 75 MHz AMD K5 to a 200 MHz Intel Pentium was released in December 1996. As the company's profit margin off the computer was slim, any production stoppage or mishap put the company at risk of insolvency. Purchasers who peeled or punctured a label in order to disassemble the Monorail PC voided their one-year warranty, only the first 90 days of which provided no labor charges. Doubling the stock 8 MB and adding 512 KB of video memory cost $199 plus shipping. Stephen Manes of the New York Times opined that these surcharges led to the user "paying a huge premium over conventional upgrades".

The computer sold well at CompUSA, becoming one of the top five best-selling computers within two months. Some of CompUSA's 122 locations hiked the price up by as much as $100, which CompUSA's marketing VP Andrew Watson said was a consequence of the company's flexible pricing agreement. Monorail later gained Circuit City, MicroWarehouse, and Egghead Computer as retail partners and Ingram Micro, SED International, and Tech Data as enterprise distributors.

While the Monorail PC initially seemed to be performing well, stiff competition from computer companies introducing sub-$1000 desktops in 1997 led sales to flounder. According to Roy Edwards of Colorado Electronic, "the same time the Monorail product hit the market, the market fell apart and there seemed to be increased competition". Production was marred by a number of setbacks, the first occurring when the die used to stamp out the steel case of the computer broke in early 1997, leading to a week-long shortage until a subcontractor successfully built a new die in five days. More urgently, Phelps found itself millions of dollars in debt and stalled manufacturing of the Monorail PC amid layoffs, leading to an order backlog of 90 days toward the end of 1997. In January 1998, Monorail fired Phelps and turned to Synnex. Phelps filed for Chapter 11 bankruptcy the following month.

=== Reorganization and decline (1997–2003) ===
In late December 1997, Monorail introduced three standard mini-towers with processors ranging from an AMD K6 clocked at 166 MHz to a Pentium MMX at 200 MHz. Monorail switched manufacturers again in March 1998, hiring SCI Systems Inc. of Huntsville, Alabama, to make its computer towers. The all-in-one Monorail PC was discontinued around the same time. In the fourth quarter that year, the company began selling network-enhanced computers for businesses under the Monorail NPC brand. These computers were manufactured by SCI. They received lukewarm praise from technology journalists but sold fairly well.

Johns left Monorail in 2002 to become senior VP of worldwide operations at Internet Security Systems. In 2009, he was named chief executive officer of Nivis, a developer and integrator of wireless sensor networks based in Atlanta. Monorail ceased operations and shut down on July 9, 2005.
