= RF module =

Electronic device to transmit and receive RF signals

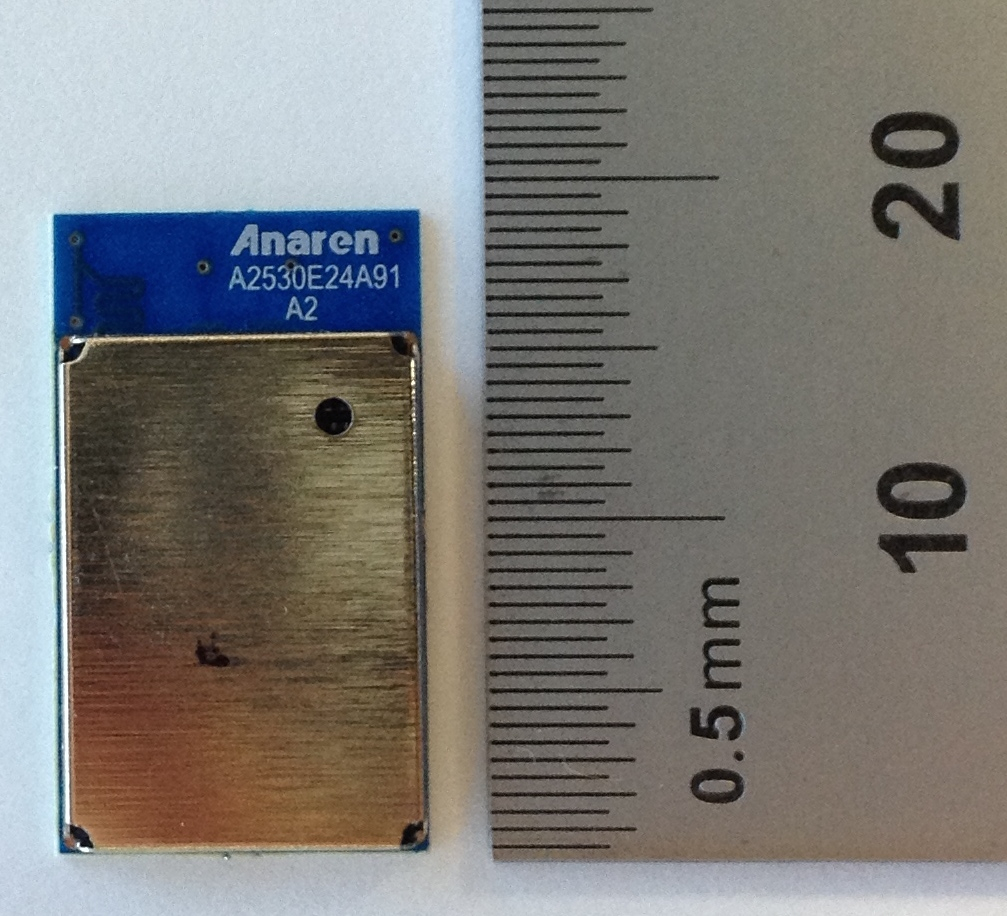
RF module (with a ruler for size reference)

An RF module (short for radio frequency module) is a (usually) small electronic device used to transmit and/or receive radio signals between two devices. In an embedded system it is often desirable to communicate with another device Wirelessly. This wireless communication may be accomplished through optical communication or through radio-frequency (RF) communication. For many applications, the medium of choice is RF since it does not require line of sight. RF communications incorporate a transmitter and a receiver. They are of various types and ranges. Some can transmit up to 500 feet. RF modules are typically fabricated using RF CMOS technology.

RF modules are widely used in electronic design owing to the difficulty of designing radio circuitry. Good electronic radio design is notoriously complex because of the sensitivity of radio circuits and the accuracy of components and layouts required to achieve operation on a specific frequency. In addition, reliable RF communication circuit requires careful monitoring of the manufacturing process to ensure that the RF performance is not adversely affected. Finally, radio circuits are usually subject to limits on radiated emissions, and require Conformance testing and certification by a standardization organization such as ETSI or the U.S. Federal Communications Commission (FCC). For these reasons, design engineers will often design a circuit for an application which requires radio communication and then "drop in" a pre-made radio module rather than attempt a discrete design, saving time and money on development.

RF modules are most often used in medium and low volume products for consumer applications such as garage door openers, wireless alarm or monitoring systems, industrial remote controls, smart sensor applications, and wireless home automation systems. They are sometimes used to replace older infrared communication designs as they have the advantage of not requiring line-of-sight operation.

Several carrier frequencies are commonly used in commercially available RF modules, including those in the industrial, scientific and medical (ISM) radio bands such as 433.92 MHz, 915 MHz, and 2400 MHz. These frequencies are used because of national and international regulations governing the used of radio for communication. Short Range Devices may also use frequencies available for unlicensed such as 315 MHz and 868 MHz.

RF modules may comply with a defined protocol for RF communications such as Zigbee, Bluetooth Low Energy, or Wi-Fi, or they may implement a proprietary protocol.

== Types of RF modules ==
The term RF module can be applied to many different types, shapes and sizes of small electronic sub assembly circuit board. It can also be applied to modules across a huge variation of functionality and capability. RF modules typically incorporate a printed circuit board, transmit or receive circuit, antenna, and serial interface for communication to the host processor.

Most standard, well known types are covered here:

- transmitter module
- receiver module
- transceiver module
- system on a chip module.

=== Transmitter modules ===
An RF transmitter module is a small PCB sub-assembly capable of transmitting a radio wave and modulating that wave to carry data. Transmitter modules are usually implemented alongside a microcontroller which will provide data to the module which can be transmitted. RF transmitters are usually subject to regulatory requirements which dictate the maximum allowable transmitter power output, harmonics, and band edge requirements.

=== Receiver modules ===
An RF receiver module receives the modulated RF signal, and demodulates it. There are two types of RF receiver modules: superheterodyne receivers and superregenerative receivers. Superregenerative modules are usually low cost and low power designs using a series of amplifiers to extract modulated data from a carrier wave. Superregenerative modules are generally imprecise as their frequency of operation varies considerably with temperature and power supply voltage. Superheterodyne receivers have a performance advantage over superregenerative; they offer increased accuracy and stability over a large voltage and temperature range. This stability comes from a fixed crystal design which in the past tended to mean a comparatively more expensive product. However, advances in receiver chip design now mean that currently there is little price difference between superheterodyne and superregenerative receiver modules.

=== Transceiver modules ===
An RF transceiver module incorporates both a transmitter and receiver. The circuit is typically designed for half-duplex operation, although full-duplex modules are available, typically at a higher cost due to the added complexity.

=== System on a chip (SoC) module ===
An SoC module is the same as a transceiver module, but it is often made with an onboard microcontroller. The microcontroller is typically used to handle radio data encapsulation (packetisation) or managing a protocol such as an IEEE 802.15.4 compliant module. This type of module is typically used for designs that require additional processing for compliance with a protocol when the designer does not wish to incorporate this processing into the host microcontroller.

== Host microcontroller interface ==
RF modules typically communicate with an embedded system, such as a microcontroller or a microprocessor. The communication protocols include UART, used in Digi International's X-Bee modules, Serial Peripheral Interface Bus used in Anaren's AIR modules and Universal Serial Bus used in Roving Networks' modules. Although the module may use a standardized protocol for wireless communication, the commands sent over the microcontroller interface are typically not standardized as each vendor has its own proprietary communications format. The speed of the microcontroller interface depends on the speed of the underlying RF protocol used: higher speed RF protocols such as Wi-Fi require a high-speed serial interface such as USB whereas protocols with a slower data rate such as Bluetooth Low Energy may use a UART interface.

== RF signal modulation ==
There are several types of digital signal modulation methods commonly used in RF transmitter and receiver modules:

- ASK
- OOK
- FSK
- Direct-sequence spread spectrum
- Frequency-hopping spread spectrum

== Main factors affecting RF module performance ==
As with any other RF device, the performance of an RF module will depend on a number of factors. For example, by increasing the transmitter power, a larger communication distance will be achieved. However, this will also result in a higher electrical power drain on the transmitter device, which will cause shorter operating life for battery powered devices. Also, using a higher transmit power will make the system more prone to interference with other RF devices, and may in fact possibly cause the device to become illegal depending on the jurisdiction. Correspondingly, increasing the receiver sensitivity will also increase the effective communication range, but will also potentially cause malfunction due to interference from other RF devices.

The performance of the overall system may be improved by using matched antennas at each end of the communication link, such as those described earlier.

Finally, the labeled remote distance of any particular system is normally measured in an open-air line of sight configuration without any interference, but often there will be obstacles such as walls, floors, or dense construction to absorb the radio wave signals, so the effective operational distance will in most practical instances be less than specified.

== Module physical connection ==
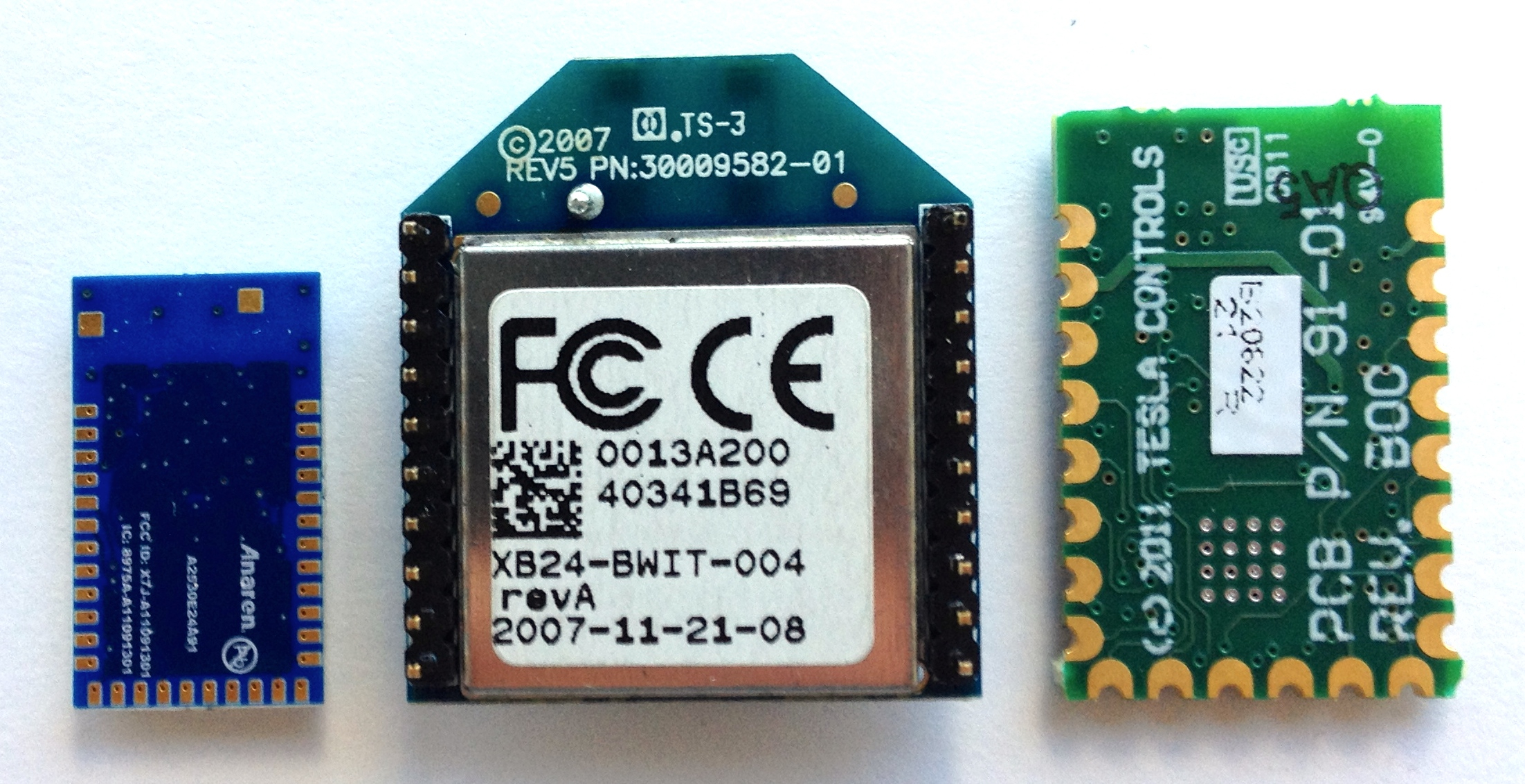
Module physical connection: land grid array, through-hole, and castellated boardlet (from left to right)

A variety of methods are used to attach an RF module to a printed circuit board, either with through-hole technology or surface-mount technology. Through-hole technology allows the module to be inserted or removed without soldering. Surface-mount technology allows the module to be attached to the PCB without an additional assembly step. Surface-mount connections used in RF modules include land grid array (LGA) and castellated pads. The LGA package allows for small module sizes as the pads are all beneath the module but connections must be X-rayed to verify connectivity. Castellated Holes enable optical inspection of the connection but will make the module footprint physically larger to accommodate the pads.

== Wireless protocols used in RF modules ==
RF modules, especially SoC modules, are frequently used to communicate according to a pre-defined wireless standard, including:

- Zigbee
- Bluetooth Low Energy
- Wi-Fi
- IEEE 802.15.4
- Z-Wave

However, RF modules also frequently communicate using proprietary protocols, such as those used in garage door openers.

== Typical applications ==
- Vehicle monitoring
- Remote control
- Telemetry
- Small-range wireless network
- Wireless meter reading
- Access control systems
- Wireless home security systems
- Area paging
- Industrial data acquisition system
- Radio tags reading
- RF contactless smart cards
- Wireless data terminals
- Wireless fire protection systems
- Biological signal acquisition
- Hydrological and meteorological monitoring
- Robot remote control
- Wireless data transmissions
- Digital video/audio transmission
- Digital home automation, such as remote light/switch
- Industrial remote control, telemetry and remote sensing
- Alarm systems and wireless transmission for various types of low-rate digital signal
- Remote control for various types of household appliances and electronics projects
- Many other applications field related to RF wireless controlling
- Mobile web server for elderly people monitoring

== RF module certification in case of final product integration ==
Final regulatory product compliance based on an integrated, compliant RF module (as most IoT devices these day's) is a common misunderstanding. A module compliant to the essential requirements of the countries regulation (FCC, CE, ICES, ANATEL etc.) does hardly ever cover the final product. However, this does not mean that full compliance testing is required when integrating a compliant RF module. Integrating a compliant module has a lot of advantages.

The RF module is essential in this day’s consumer product but also only a part of the final product. Radio modules have evolved during the years. Onboard voltage regulators, integrated antenna generally try to ensure that the radio phenomena stay the same no matter of their host. You can refer to most RF spectrum measurements on a modular level for compliance when testing and certifying your product at an ISO 17025 accredited EMC, RF laboratory.

At the end it is the final product that needs to comply with the regulations. Aspects as health, safety, Radiated susceptibility can not be covered on a modular level.
