= Hirose Electric Group =

Japanese company

Hirose Electric Co., Ltd.
- Native name: ヒロセ電機株式会社
- Company type: Public KK
- Traded as: TYO: 6806
- Industry: Electronics
- Founded: Tokyo (August 15, 1937; 88 years ago)
- Headquarters: Nakagawa Chuoh, Tsuzuki-ku, Yokohama 224-8540, Japan
- Key people: Kazunori Ishii (President and CEO)
- Products: Connectors; Switches; Printed circuits
- Revenue: ▲JPY 165.5 billion (FY 2023) (US$ 1.1 billion) (FY 2023)
- Net income: ▲JPY 26.5 billion (FY 2023) (US$ 176.4 million) (FY 2023)
- Number of employees: 4,654 (as of March 31, 2024)
- Website: Official website

Hirose Electric Co., Ltd. (ヒロセ電機株式会社, Hirose Denki kabushiki-gaisha) is a Japanese company specializing in the manufacturing of electric connectors. The company was founded in 1937 as Hirose Manufacturing, changed its name to Hirose Electric in August 1963 and started selling internationally in 1968.

Hirose also manufactures flexible printed circuits for smartphones and gets about 70 percent of revenue from outside Japan.

== Connectors ==
Hirose is mainly known for its ".FL" series of surface-mount connectors, the best-known being Hirose U.FL used in Wi-Fi equipment. They include:

Name	Length	Width	Height (Typ. / Max.)
H.FL	4.5	5	3
E.FL	3.4	3.4	3
U.FL	3.1	3.0	2.4 / 2.5
U.FL(V)	3.1	3.0	1.9 / 2.0
W.FL(G)	2.0	2.0	1.65 / 1.85
W.FL	2.0	2.0	1.4 / 1.55
All units are in millimeters.

== Product gallery ==
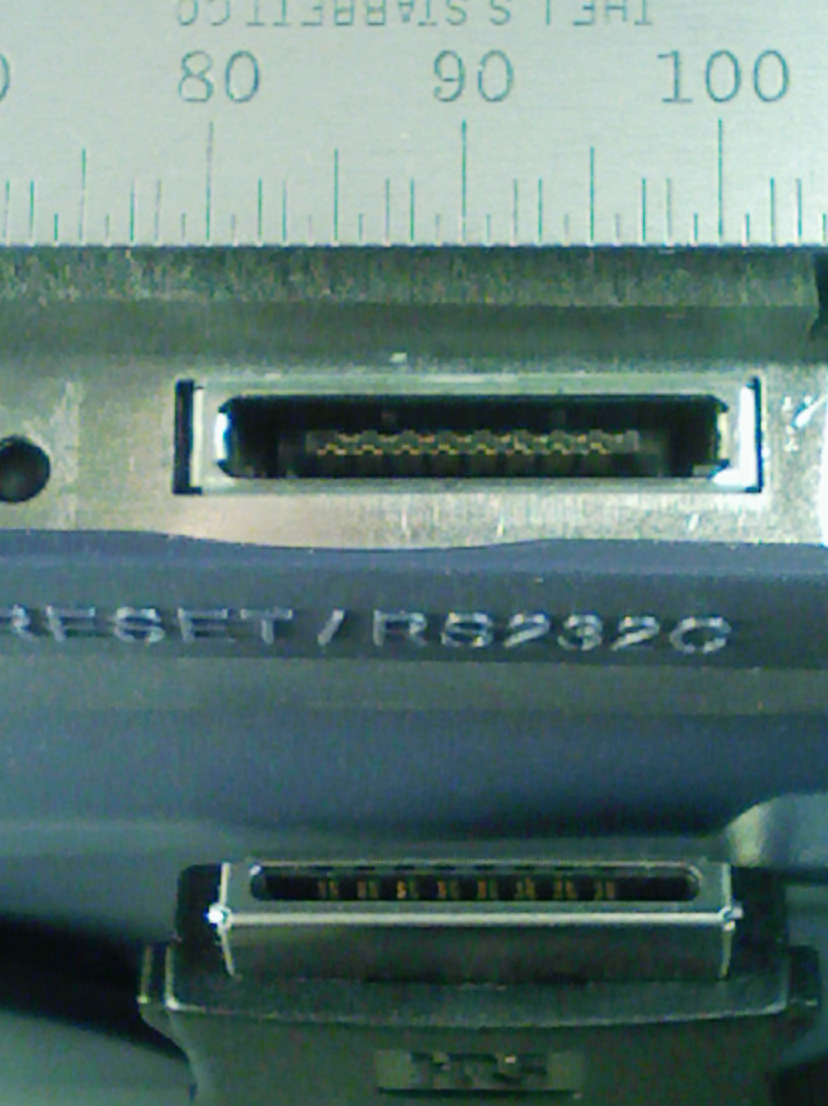
A Hirose 3560-16S used for RS-232 on a Tatung TWN-5213 CU tablet computer

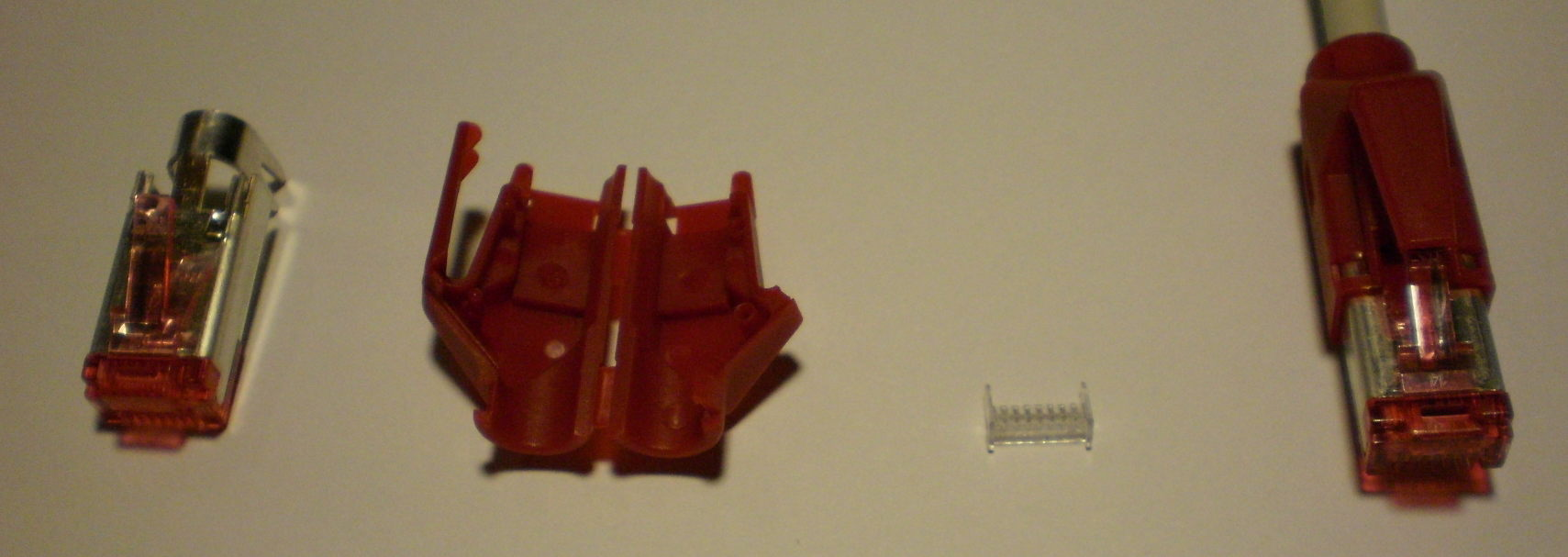
Hirose TM21 modular plug

== See also ==
- Hirose U.FL connector, used in Wi-Fi equipment
- Hirose W.FL connector
