= TSMP =

TSMP, an acronym for Time Synchronized Mesh Protocol, was developed by Dust Networks as a communications protocol for self-organizing networks of wireless devices called motes. TSMP devices stay synchronized to each other and communicate in time-slots, similar to other TDM (time-division multiplexing) systems. Such deterministic communication allows the devices to stay extremely low power, as the radios only turn on for the periods of scheduled communication. The protocol is designed to operate very reliably in a noisy environment. It uses channel hopping to avoid interference -- the packets between TSMP devices get sent on different radio channels depending on time of transmission. TSMP distinguishes itself from other time-slotted mesh-based protocols, in that time-slot timing is maintained continuously and enables a network to duty-cycle on a transmitter-receiver pair-wise basis, as opposed to putting the entire network to sleep for extended periods of time (as is done in a beacon-based protocol, such as DigiMesh).

Dust Networks' underlying time synchronized mesh networking technology has been standardized by the HART Communications Foundation with the WirelessHART protocol, the International Society of Automation ISA100 standard and in internet protocol standards, such as IEEE802.15.4E MAC layer, and IETF 6TiSCh.

Time synchronized mesh networking is marketed for applications that require reliability and ultra long battery life, typically measured in years. It is intended for the industrial market for manufacturing-process monitoring and control.

== See also ==
- Wireless sensor network
