= MiWi =

- International standard: IEEE 802.15.4
- Developed by: Microchip Technology
- Industry: Wireless mesh, IoT
- Compatible hardware: SAMR30, SAMR21, MRF89XA, MRF24J40
- Physical range: 20–100 meters

MiWi is a proprietary wireless protocol supporting peer-to-peer, star network connectivity. It was designed by Microchip Technology. MiWi uses small, low-power digital radios based on the IEEE 802.15.4 standard, and is designed for low-power, cost-constrained networks, such as industrial monitoring and control, home and building automation, remote control, wireless sensors, lighting control, and automated meter reading.

The MiWi protocol is supported on Microchip's SAMR30 (sub-gigahertz) and SAMR21 (2.4 GHz) ARM Cortex-M0+ devices and modules. Legacy MiWi protocol code supporting PIC and dsPIC microcontrollers has been frozen and is no longer recommended for new designs; however, it is still available in the Microchip Library for Applications (MLA) for the MPLAB Integrated Development Environment.

== Protocols ==
Microchip Technology released technical information on MiWi. These are not primarily protocol specifications and are focused on implementing the MiWi protocol on Microchip microcontrollers.

As of 2019, interoperable third party implementations have not appeared. Unless they do, it will not be clear if those specifications are complete or accurate enough to serve roles other than supporting Microchip's code or being one more proprietary example of a lightweight WPAN stack. Many developers trying to use WPAN technologies have observed that the competing Zigbee WPAN protocol seems undesirably complex. Accordingly, there exists a technical niche for simpler protocols, of which MiWi is a proprietary example.

== Software ==
The MiWi protocol is a small foot-print alternative (3K-32K) to Zigbee (40K-180K), for cost-sensitive applications with limited memory. The MiWi protocol stack supports star network and peer-to-peer wireless-network topologies, useful for simple, short-range, wireless node-to-node communication. Additionally, the stack provides sleeping-node, active-scan and energy-detect features while supporting the low-power requirements of battery-operated devices.

== Hardware ==
=== MiWi Silicon ===
Microchip Technology released MiWi support on the SAMR30 and SAMR21 RF-MCU's in 2018. Both devices are ARM Cortex M0+, and have 256 KB Flash and up to 40 KB RAM and utilize OQPSK RF Modulation defined in IEEE 802.15.4 for a +3dB advantage in power efficiency vs. FSK modulation. Legacy devices supporting MiWi include several PIC Microcontrollers paired with the MRF89XA (Proprietary Sub-GHz Transceiver) or the MRF24J40 (an IEEE 802.15.4 2.4 GHz transceiver).

MiWi Modules

MiWi module produced by Microchip Technology beside a 1 cent coin.

In 2018 Microchip released the SAMR30M, a module based on the SAMR30 Cortex M0+ sub-GHz RF-MCU.

In 2008, Microchip released a 2.4 GHz wireless transceiver module with a standard 4-wire SPI interface paired with several Microchip PIC and dsPIC microcontrollers (the Microchip MRF24J40MA, MRF24J40MD, MRF24J40ME), and can be used in production devices. Being ZigBee compliant, and capable of communicating using MiWi wireless protocols, it is based on the IEEE 802.15.4 Wireless PAN standard. Option are for PCB antenna or u.FL connected antenna. The modules are regulatory-agency certified for the USA (Federal Communications Commission (FCC) Part 15, Subpart C), Canada (Industry Canada) and European - Radio Equipment Directive (RED) 2014/53/EU, eliminating the need for users to receive independent FCC certification for their wireless products.

=== Network Analyzer ===
Microchip Technology's ZENA (Zigbee Enhanced Network Analyzer) is a wireless packet sniffer and network analyzer following the IEEE 802.15.4 specification on the 2.4 GHz band. The ZENA analyzer supports both the ZigBee and MiWi protocols. Accompanying software can analyze network traffic and graphically display decoded packets. It can also display the network topology and the messages as they flow through the network. With the provided key of the network, data on encrypted MiWi networks can be sniffed and viewed as well.
