= NeuRFon =

The neuRFon project (named for a combination of "neuron" and "RF") was a research program begun in 1999 at Motorola Labs to develop ad hoc wireless networking for wireless sensor network applications. The biological analogy was that, while individual neurons were not very useful, in a large network they became very powerful; the same was thought to hold true for simple, low power wireless devices. Much of the technology developed in the neuRFon program was placed in the IEEE 802.15.4 standard and in the Zigbee specification; examples are the 2.4 GHz physical layer of the IEEE 802.15.4 standard and significant portions of the Zigbee multi-hop routing protocol.
