= Hirose U.FL =

Miniature RF connector

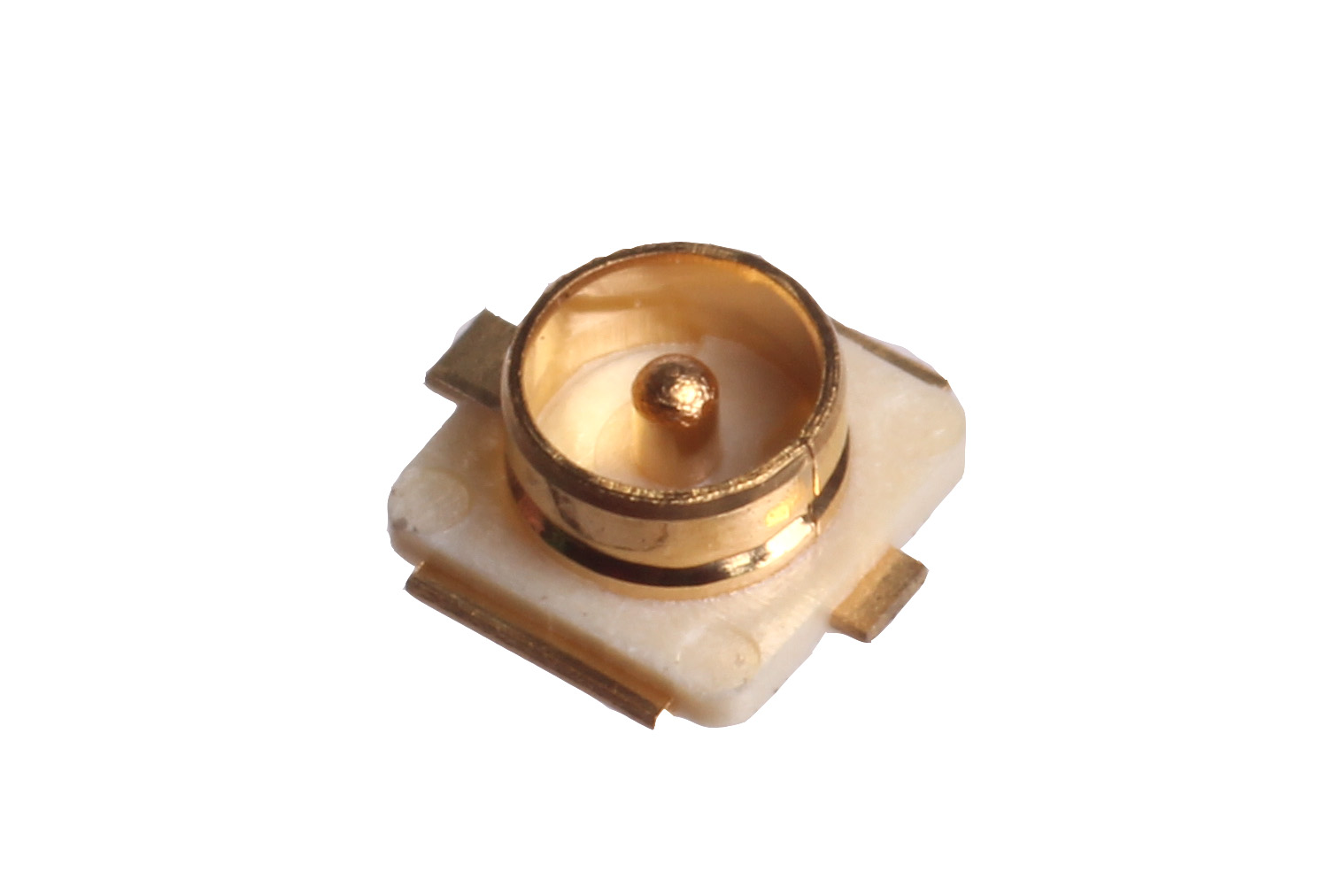
- Male U.FL connector
- Type: RF coaxial connector

Production history
- Designed: 1991
- Manufacturer: Hirose Electric Group

General specifications
- Diameter: 2.0 mm (0.079 in)
- Cable: Coaxial
- Passband: Typically 0-6 GHz

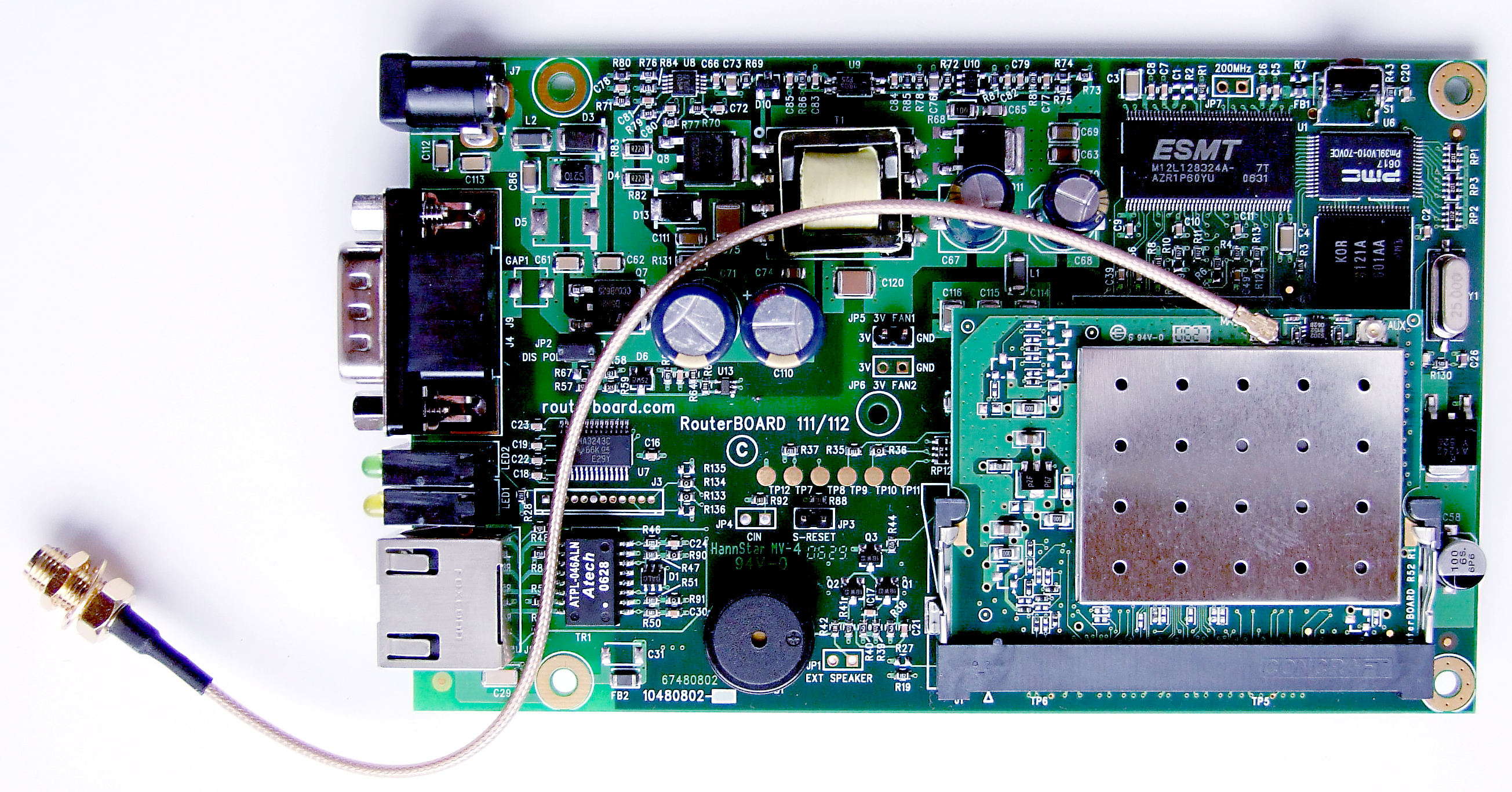
An embedded RouterBoard 112 with U.FL-RSMA pigtail and R52 mini PCI Wi-Fi card.

Hirose U.FL, I-PEX MHF I (Note: occasionally written "MHF1" or "IPEX1"), AMC or UMCC (Note: Ultraminiature Coax Connector and Cable Assembly Style A Series, Tyco Electronics) is a miniature RF connector for high-frequency signals up to 6 GHz manufactured by Hirose Electric Group, I-PEX, and others.

U.FL connectors are commonly used in applications where space is of critical concern, such as in smartphones and laptop Wi-Fi cards. U.FL connectors are commonly used inside laptops and embedded systems to connect the Wi-Fi antenna to a Mini PCI, Mini PCIe or M.2 Wi-Fi card. Another common use is connecting GPS antennas.

Female U.FL connectors are not designed with reconnection in mind, and they are only rated for a few reconnects (approximately 30 mating cycles) before replacement is needed. The female U.FL connectors are generally not sold separately, but rather as part of a pigtail with a high-quality 1.32 mm doubly shielded cable, which allows for a low-loss connection, insulated with fluorinated resin.

The male connectors are surface-mounted (SMT) and soldered directly to the printed circuit board (PCB). They are designed to have a characteristic impedance of 50 ohms. The mated connection is only 2.5 mm high and takes as little as 9 mm^{2} (3.0 × 3.1 mm) of board space.

Much like many other electronic components, Hirose U.FL connectors were protected by patents and trademarks. However, compatible third party connectors are available under many other names, such as Sunridge MCB.

== Hirose W.FL ==
Hirose W.FL
- Type: RF coaxial connector

Production history
- Manufacturer: Hirose Electric Group
- Cable: coaxial
- Passband: 0-6 GHz

The Hirose W.FL, also known as Amphenol AMMC, is an ultra-small RF connector used in handheld electronic products. It is manufactured by Hirose Electric Group and has a frequency range up to 6 GHz. W.FL occupies even less area (2.0 mm diameter) and height (1.4 mm) than U.FL. Like U.FL, W.FL also has many more names assigned to it by those producing compatible connectors.

== Variants ==
Many confusingly-similar looking connectors are called U.FL. The same or compatible connectors can also confusingly have multiple names, coming from different vendors or being transcribed differently.

- H.FL
  - older, bigger, footprint 5x4.5 mm, square area 4.5x4 mm, male outer diameter 2.4 mm, center pin diameter 0.5 mm, mated height 3.0 mm
  - up to 3 GHz, cable groups 1.32/1.37/1.48 mm and RG178
- E.FL
  - older, bigger, footprint 3.4x3.4 mm, square area 2.8x2.8 mm, male outer diameter 2.0 mm, center pin diameter 0.5 mm, mated height 3.0 mm
  - up to 2 GHz, cable groups 0.81/1.32 mm
- U.FL, I-PEX MHF I, IPEX1, IPX1, MHF, MHF I, MHF1, AMC, MCRF, GS, TXR, UM, UMC, UMCX, ultra-miniature coaxial:
  - footprint 3.0x3.1 mm, square area 2.6x2.6 mm, male outer diameter 2.0 mm, center pin diameter 0.5 mm, mated height 2.4 mm (2.5 mm max) or 1.9 mm (2.5 mm max) for U.FL-LP(V)
  - most common
  - up to 6 GHz, cable groups 0.81/1.13/1.32/1.37 mm (LP(V) only 0.81 mm), MHF1 also RG174 and RG178
  - MHF 1 LK with a slide-over mechanical lock
  - N.FL variant with reduced mating height (1.4 mm (1.5 mm max), barrel portion height 0.25mm, total male connector height off board 0.8 mm), 6 GHz, cable group 0.81 mm
- IPEX2, IPX2
  - lower mated height than IPEX1, otherwise somewhat similar
  - very rare
- IPEX3, IPX3, MHF III, MHF3:
  - footprint 2.00x2.05 mm, square area 1.7x1.7 mm, male outer diameter 1.40 mm, center pin diameter 0.40 mm
  - some sources claim compatibility with W.FL (dubious?)
- W.FL, IPEX4, IPX4, MHF IV, MHF4, MHF4/4L, AMC4, HSC, MXHP32:
  - footprint 2.0x2.0 mm, square area 1.76x1.68 mm, male outer diameter 1.5 mm, center pin diameter 0.45 mm, mated height 1.2 mm (1.4 and 1.7 mm for thicker cables)
  - increasingly common, especially with 5GHz devices and 5G
  - up to 6 or 9 GHz, cable group 0.81 mm, MHF4L also 0.64, 0.95, 1.13 and 1.37 mm
  - MHF4L up to 12 GHz, or to 9 GHz when mated with MHF4 female
  - M.2 standard (MHF4L)
  - W.FL2 variant with mated height 1.2 mm
  - MHF 4 LK with a slide-over mechanical lock
  - may be slight difference between MHF4 and W.FL, MHF4(L) said to be compatible
- X.FL, IPEX5, IPX5, MHF5, MHF5L:
  - footprint 2x2 mm, square area 1.7x1.7 mm, male outer diameter 1.40 mm, mated height max. 1 mm (MHF5) or 1.3mm (MHF5L)
  - up to 12 GHz, MHF 5L up to 15 GHz; cable groups 0.5/0.64/0.81/1.13 mm
  - incompatible with W.FL/W.FL2
- MHF7
- MHF7S
  - footprint 2x2 mm, square area 2.0x2.0 mm, male outer diameter 1.5 mm, center pin diameter 0.35 mm, mated height 1.4 mm max, male total height from board 0.53 mm
  - up to 15 GHz, full EMI shield, for 5G mmWave applications

Other similar connectors with male on board: JSC, KSC, LSC, MHF-A, OSMT (dissimilar)

With female on board: MHF-SW23, MMS, MMT, MS-156C, MS-162, MS-166, MS-180, SWD, SWF, SWG, SWH, SWJ
