= Disney monorail =

Disney monorail may refer to:

- Disney Resort Line, at the Tokyo Disney Resort in Japan
- Disneyland Monorail, at the Disneyland Resort in California, United States
- Walt Disney World Monorail System, at the Walt Disney World Resort in Florida, United States

== See also ==
- Rail transport in Walt Disney Parks and Resorts
