= DevLab (research alliance) =

Dutch-based research center

- Type: Nonprofit cooperative
- Industry: Electronics
- Genre: collaborative research organisation
- Founded: 2004
- Headquarters: Eindhoven, Netherlands
- Key people: Lex van Gijsel, managing director
- Services: Research, education
- Number of employees: 3
- Website: www.devlab.nl

DevLab (Development laboratory) is a research center headquartered in Eindhoven, The Netherlands. It is an alliance of thirteen Small and Medium Enterprises. In close co-operation with universities, with a network of professors and lectors, research projects are carried out by graduation students, Ph.D students, and employees of the member SMEs. With this concept DevLab is also partner in larger consortia, together with industry, universities and other research institutes.

== History ==
The Development Club is one of the clusters of the Federation of Technology Branches in the Netherlands, FHI, within the branch industrial electronics. It is a network of approximately 45 technology companies working on product development in the field of electronics, mechatronics, embedded software and industrial design. The Development Club is the source of the idea to set up a co-operation where scientific research will be carried out, by and for the member companies. This eventually led to the foundation in 2004 of DevLab, Development Laboratories.

Location of DevLab

1956	Foundation FHI
1994	Foundation of Development Club
2002	Establishment of network of professors and lectors
2003	Special "Lemmer"-workshop formed the basis of DevLab (June 12)
2004	Formal establishment of "Coöperatie DevLab Development Laboratories" with 12 SME partners (October 12)
2005	Operational start in the Laplace building at the campus of the Eindhoven University of Technology (February 1)
2009	Installation of a full-time managing director (March 1)

== Research domains ==
The DevLab research agenda currently contains 4 focus areas:

- sensor network technology (MyriaNed)
- independent energy supply
- embedded communication
- advanced micro actuators

These areas are captured into a number of projects DevLab is leading or participating in.

== Members ==
Company name	Description
Almende	Almende is a Dutch research company specialized in information and communication technologies.
Connect B.V.	Connect B.V. is an independent LonWorks specialist, specialized in construction related installations.
Nanosens	Nanosens develops and utilizes the latest developments and advancements of the just emerging and exciting nanotechnology to make smart, portable and inexpensive sensing systems for ultrasensitive and rapid detection of biological and chemical species.
Sioux Electronics	Sioux Electronics develops and produces hardware and software for industrial and medical applications.
Van Mierlo Ingenieursbureau	Van Mierlo Ingenieursbureau is specialized in realizing hardware and software solutions for controlsystems.
ICY	ICY is a product developer for home and building automation systems.
KITT Engineering	KITT specializes in developing hard and software on the edge of Art and Technology.
Sense Observation Systems	Sense is a technology company providing context aware communication and transaction support.
Metatronics	Metatronics develops electronic products from the concept of a customer to production.
