= Anaren =

American RF electronics manufacturer

Anaren Inc.
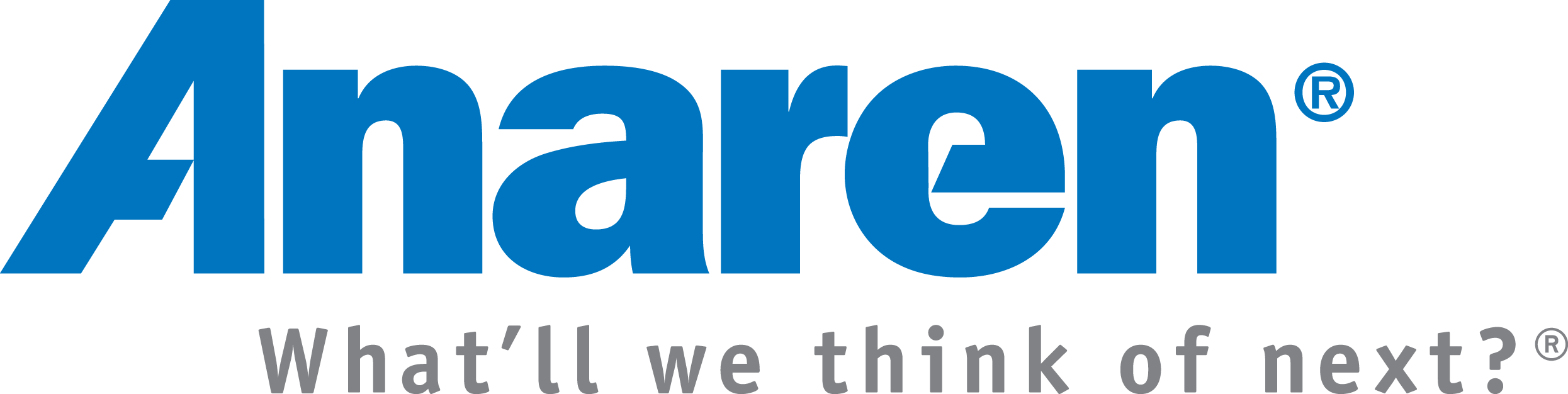
- Industry: Electronics
- Founded: 1967
- Founder: Hugh A. Hair; Carl W. Gerst Jr.
- Defunct: 2018
- Fate: Acquired by TTM Technologies
- Headquarters: East Syracuse, New York, U.S.
- Products: RF components Microwave electronics
- Number of employees: 1,100 (2018)
- Website: anaren.com

Anaren, Inc. was an American manufacturer of high-frequency radio and microwave electronics. Founded in 1967 and headquartered in Syracuse, New York, it was acquired in 2018 by TTM Technologies. Anaren produced RF microelectronics, components, and assemblies for customers in the aerospace and defense, networking, and communications industries, including the wireless and satellite communications sectors.

== History ==
Anaren Microwave, Inc. was founded in 1967 by Hugh A. Hair and Carl W. Gerst Jr. in Syracuse, New York. Both were RF engineers who had worked together at General Electric and at SRC Inc. before establishing Anaren to focus on leveraging the stripline manufacturing technique. The company began trading on the Nasdaq in 1972, and its first customers were aerospace and defense firms including Hughes Aircraft, Litton Industries (now part of Northrop Grumman), and Raytheon. Early contracts included: a microwave landing system for jetliners funded by the U.S. Department of Defense under FAA supervision; wideband microwave tracking receivers for use in direction-finding systems; and DFD (digital frequency discriminator) and ESM (electronic support measure) devices to assist jets and ships in detecting, identifying, and eluding enemy radar signals. The Cold War arms race drove the bulk of the company's business, and by 1981, it had 200 employees, achieved over US$8 million in sales, and constructed a 80,000 square feet (7,400 m^{2}) headquarters in East Syracuse, New York. In 1989, Anaren made defense-related sales of $24 million.

After the end of the Cold War, the company diversified in the 1990s by entering the wireless infrastructure market with its Xinger brand of surface-mount passive components, including hybrid couplers, directional couplers, and power dividers for base stations. Anaren's components were also used in the Iridium satellite constellation. In 2000, Anaren acquired Long Island–based RF Power and North Andover, Massachusetts–based Amitron, which were consolidated at a new plant in Salem, New Hampshire as Anaren Ceramics, enabling expansion into ceramics technologies such as low temperature co-fired ceramics (LTCC) and the medical, optical, automotive, aerospace, and other markets. In 2002, Anaren established a new plant in Suzhou, China. In 2006, the company surpassed $100 million in annual sales. In 2008, it acquired Syracuse-based MS Kennedy and Littleton, Colorado–based Unicircuit, Inc, which were added to the company's Space & Defense Group. Later contracts included a $6 million contract with SRC to make part of a U.S. Army system countering remote-controlled improvised explosive devices, $13 million in contracts from Lockheed Martin in 2007 for subassemblies to help U.S. Navy helicopters detect enemy fire, and a $20 million contact in 2010 with Thales Alenia Space to produce components for communications satellites.

In 2014, Anaren was acquired by private equity firm Veritas Capital for $383 million, and in 2018 was acquired by TTM Technologies for $775 million.
