= Wireless Compliance Institute =

Wireless products and systems standards organization

ISA100 Wireless Compliance Institute
- Established: 2009
- Focus: Wireless standards
- Members: 20
- Location: Research Triangle Park, NC, United States
- Website: www.isa100wci.org

The ISA100 Wireless Compliance Institute (WCI) is an organization that functions as an operational group within The Automation Standards Compliance Institute (ASCI), to establish specifications and processes used in the testing and certification of wireless products and systems for the ISA100.11a wireless standard. Manufacturing and automation control systems users and suppliers work together in the Wireless Compliance Institute to develop and deploy standards-based, industrial wireless devices and systems.

The mission of the ISA100 Wireless Compliance Institute is to build consensus around industry standards arising from the work of ISA100 Standards Committee on Wireless Systems for Automation, and to enforce their effective and consistent application. WCI owns the 'ISA100 Wireless COMPLIANT' certification scheme and conducts independent testing and certification of devices to ensure they conform to the ISA100.11a standard. By providing the ISA100 Wireless Compliant stamp of approval, users, suppliers and integrators can function under a single technical standard, enhancing inter-operability in the selection and deployment of wireless products and systems.

== History ==
In 2006, The Automation Standards Compliance Institute (ASCI) was formed by the International Society of Automation to provide organizational focus for certification and compliance assessment activities in the automation industry. The ISA100 Wireless Compliance Institute was created in 2009 under ASCI to allow further organization and infrastructure for specific processes and developments related to the ISA100 family of wireless standards.

== WCI Membership ==
WCI members are generally from the manufacturing and automation controls community. WCI memberships are classified as Supplier and Non-Supplier. Supplier membership is offered to any organization that manufactures or supplies products used in industrial wireless systems. A Non-Supplier membership is offered to organizations not classified as a Supplier. Both Supplier and Non-Supplier memberships pay annual dues based on membership level.

== Governing Board (April 27, 2012) ==
- Honeywell - Dan Sheflin (Chairman)
- Yokogawa - Dr. Penny Chen (Vice Chairman)
- Shell Global Solutions - Berry Mulder (User Representative)
- General Electric - Justin Smith
- Azbil – Hisashi Sasajima
