= OpenWSN =

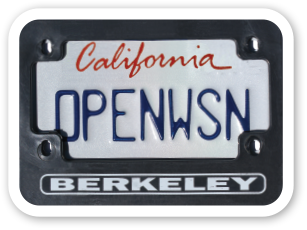
The OpenWSN logo

OpenWSN aims to build an open standard-based and open source implementation of a complete constrained network protocol stack for wireless sensor networks and Internet of Things. The project was created at the University of California Berkeley and extended at the INRIA and at the Open University of Catalonia (UOC). The root of OpenWSN is a deterministic MAC layer implementing the IEEE 802.15.4e TSCH based on the concept of Time Slotted Channel Hopping (TSCH). Above the MAC layer, the Low Power Lossy Network stack is based on IETF standards including the IETF 6TiSCH management and adaptation layer (a minimal configuration profile, 6top protocol and different scheduling functions). The stack is complemented by an implementation of 6LoWPAN, RPL in non-storing mode, UDP and CoAP, enabling access to devices running the stack from the native IPv6 through open standards.

OpenWSN is related to other projects including the following:

- RIOT
- OpenMote

OpenWSN is available for Linux, Windows and OS X platforms. Current release of OpenWSN is 1.14.0.
