= ISA100.11a =

ISA100.11a is a wireless networking technology standard developed by the International Society of Automation (ISA). The official description is "Wireless Systems for Industrial Automation: Process Control and Related Applications".

The ISA100 committee is part of ISA and was formed in 2005 to establish standards and related information that will define procedures for implementing wireless systems in the automation and control environment with a focus on the field level. The committee is made up of over 400 automation professionals from nearly 250 companies worldwide. The committee also represents end users, wireless suppliers, system integrators, research firms, consultants, government agencies, and industry consortia. Committee members lend their expertise to the advancement of the ISA100 series of standards.

In 2009, the ISA Automation Standards Compliance Institute established the ISA100 Wireless Compliance Institute. The ISA100 Wireless Compliance Institute owns the 'ISA100 Compliant' certification scheme which provides independent testing of ISA100 based products to ensure that they conform to the ISA100 standard.

== Timeline ==
- May 2009: the ISA100 standards committee voted to approve ISA100.11a, "Wireless Systems for Industrial Automation: Process Control and Related Applications".
- July 2009: Nivis announced ISA100.11a software.
- September 9, 2009: ISA officially released ISA100.11a.
- October 2009: Arkema in Crosby, Texas, in conjunction with the ISA100 Wireless Compliance Institute, conducted a multi vendor interoperability test.
- Honeywell Process Solutions announced ISA100.11a compliant starter kits and complete systems.
- Yokogawa announced products based on ISA100.11a standards, including wireless gateway with pressure and temperature transmitter.
- 2010: the ISA100 committee approved a major corrigendum to the 2009 edition of the standard reflecting comments received from organizations implementing the standard, and other commenters seeking clarification. The 2010 edition of the standard was submitted to the IEC SC65C in the form of a PAS (Publicly Available Specification) and as a New Work Item for international standardization. In this form, it has been numbered as IEC 62734.
