= Silicon Labs =

American semiconductor company

Silicon Laboratories, Inc.

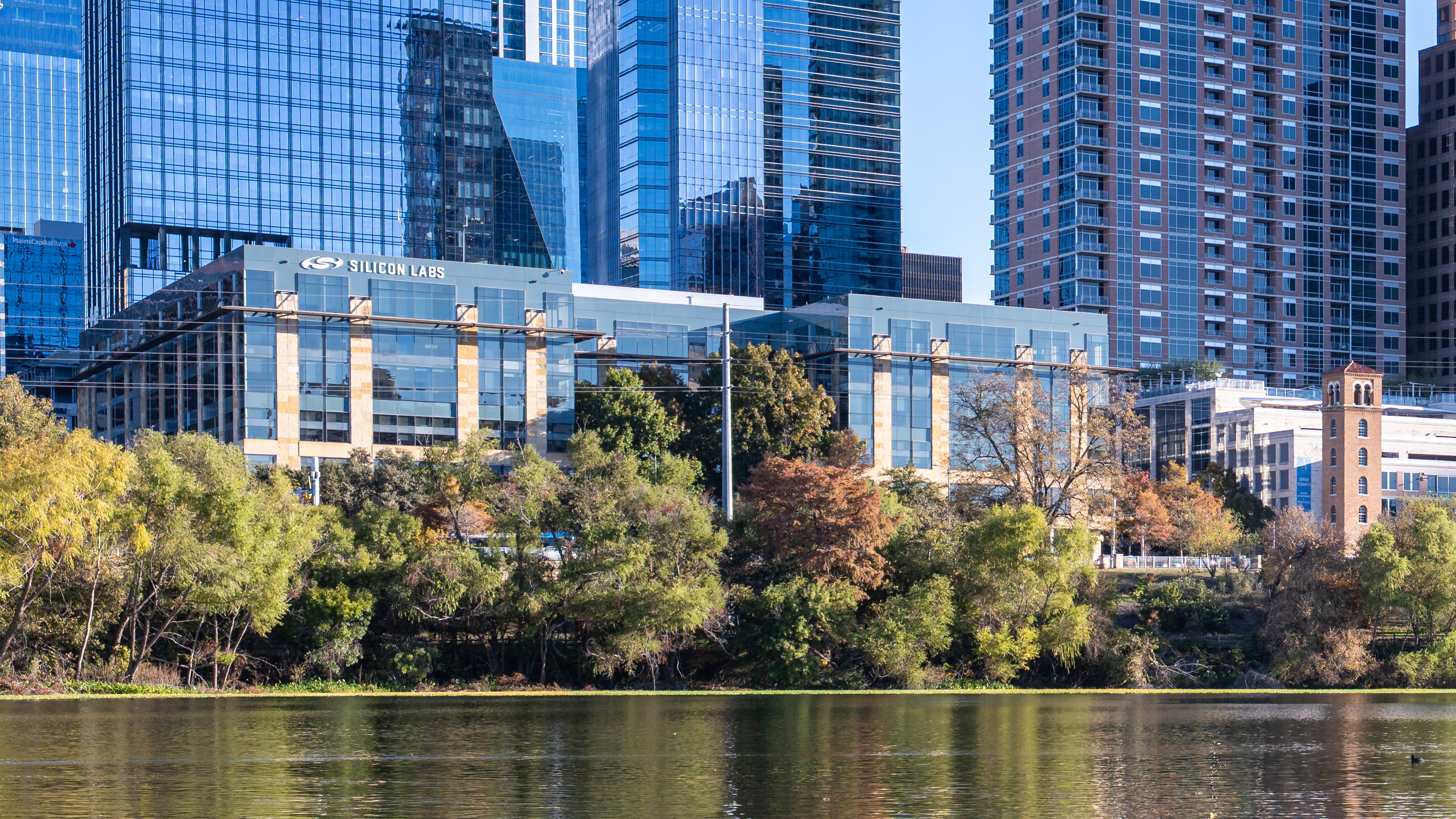
- Silicon Labs' Headquarters in Austin, TX
- Type: Public
- Traded as: Nasdaq: SLAB; S&P 400 component
- Industry: Semiconductors
- Founded: 1996; 30 years ago
- Founders: Nav Sooch; Dave Welland; Jeff Scott
- Headquarters: Austin, Texas, United States
- Key people: Matt Johnson (CEO); Nav Sooch (chairman)
- Products: Microcontrollers; Sensors
- Revenue: ▲US$785 million (2025)
- Operating income: ▲ −US$71 million (2025)
- Net income: ▲ −US$64.9 million (2025)
- Total assets: ▲US$1.27 billion (2025)
- Total equity: ▲US$1.09 billion (2025)
- Number of employees: 1,900 (2025)
- Website: silabs.com

Silicon Laboratories, Inc., commonly referred to as Silicon Labs, is a fabless global technology company that designs and manufactures semiconductors, other silicon devices and software, which it sells to electronics design engineers and manufacturers in Internet of Things (IoT) infrastructure worldwide.

It is headquartered in Austin, Texas, United States. The company focuses on microcontrollers (MCUs) and wireless system on chips (SoCs) and modules. The company also produces software stacks including firmware libraries and protocol-based software, and a free software development platform called Simplicity Studio.

Silicon Labs was founded in 1996 and two years later released its first product, an updated DAA design that enabled manufacturers to reduce the size and cost of a modem. During its first three years, the company focused on RF and CMOS integration, and developed the world's first CMOS RF synthesizer for mobile phones which was released in 1999. Following the appointment of Tyson Tuttle as the CEO in 2012, Silicon Labs has increasingly focused on developing technologies for the IoT market, which in 2019 accounted for more than 50 percent of the company's revenue, but in 2020 had increased to about 58 percent.

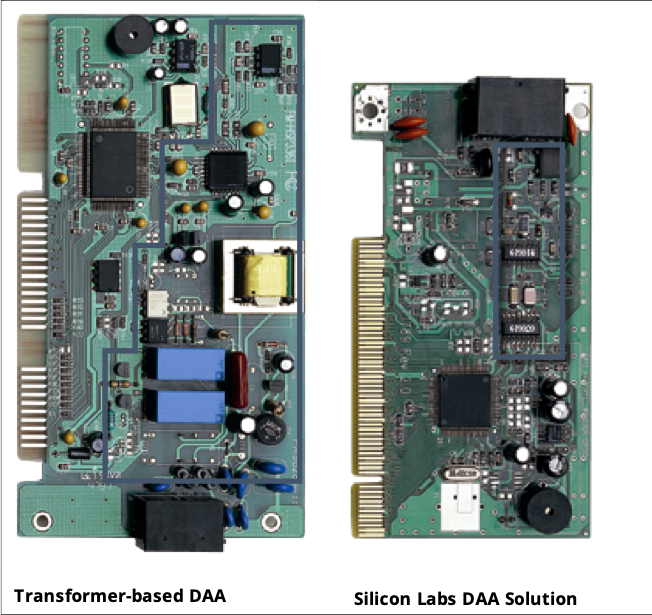
In 1998, Silicon Labs released its first product, an updated Direct Access Arrangement (DAA) design that enabled manufacturers to reduce the size and cost of a modem.

In August 2019, Silicon Labs had more than 1,770 patents worldwide issued or pending.

In February 2026, Texas Instruments announced its intent to buy Silicon Labs for $7.5 billion.

== History ==
Silicon Labs was founded by Crystal Semiconductor (now owned by Cirrus Logic Inc.) alumni Nav Sooch, Dave Welland and Jeff Scott in 1996. It became a publicly traded company in 2000. The first product, an updated DAA design, was released in the market in 1998. It cost significantly less than traditional DAAs and used less space compared to established products, which made it an instant success, taking the company's sales from $5.6 million in 1998 to nearly $47 million in 1999.

During its early years, the company focused on developing an improved RF synthesizer for mobile phones that would cost less and take up less space. It introduced its first RF Chip in late 1999.

Since 2012, Silicon Labs has been increasingly focused on developing technologies for the evolving IoT market. On April 22, 2021, Silicon Labs announced the sale of its infrastructure and automotive business to Skyworks Solutions Inc for $2.75 billion. The deal was closed on July 26, 2021.

In July 2021, it was announced that Tyson Tuttle would be stepping down as CEO. In January 2022, former president Matt Johnson completed the transition into the CEO position.

=== Key product launches ===
- In 1998, released updated DAA design.
- In 1999, launched RF Chip.
- In 2001, released first products in its timing portfolio, a family of clock generators designed for high-speed communication systems.
- In 2003, entered the mixed-signal MCU market with analog-intensive high-speed 8-bit MCUs.
- In 2004, released its first crystal oscillator family featuring patented digital signal processing phase locked loop (DSPLL) technology.
- In 2005, introduced a single-chip FM receiver, which enabled FM radio to be installed in a new range of applications.
- In 2006, entered the automotive electronics market with the launch of an integrated MCU family.
- In 2007, launched industry's first single-port PoE interface with integrated DC-DC controller.
- In 2008, released industry's smallest fully integrated automotive AM/FM radio receiver IC.
- In 2009, entered the human interface market with a portfolio of fast-response touch, proximity and ambient light sensor devices.
- In 2010, introduced industry's first single-chip multimedia digital TV demodulator.
- In 2011, released industry's first single-chip hybrid TV receiver.
- In 2012, entered the ARM-based 32-bit MCU market with a line of mixed-signal MCUs with USB and non-USB options.
- In 2013, introduced the world's first single-chip digital radio receivers for consumer electronics.
- In 2014, released the world's first digital ultraviolet index sensors.
- In 2015, launched Thread networking technology for connecting devices including wireless sensor networks, thermostats, connected lighting devices and control panels.
- In 2016, released Gecko family of multiprotocol wireless SoC devices.
- In 2017, launched industry's first wireless clocks that support 4G/LTE and Ethernet.
- In 2018, launched Z-Wave 700 hardware/software IoT platform.
- In 2019, launched updated version of wireless Gecko web development platform.
- In 2021, launched Wi-SUN^{®} technology
- In 2021, announced that Silicon Labs wireless devices support Matter end products

== Leadership ==
- Matt Johnson, Chief Executive Officer
- Dean Butler, Chief Financial Officer
- Daniel Cooley, Chief Technology Officer
- Radhika Chennakeshavula, Chief Information Officer
- Serena Townsend, Senior Vice President and Chief People Officer
- Brandon Tolany, Senior Vice President of Worldwide Sales and Marketing
- Bob Conrad, Senior Vice President, Worldwide Operations
- Sharon Hagi, Chief Security Officer
- Néstor Ho Gutiérrez, Chief Legal Officer, Vice President and Corporate Secretary

== Products ==
Silicon Labs provides semiconductor products for use in a variety of connected devices. The company also provides development kits and software including Simplicity Studio, an integrated development environment for IoT connected device applications.

Silicon Labs' portfolio is built around the Internet of Things (IoT) focus area, primarily focused on home and life and industrial and commercial wireless applications.

=== Internet of Things ===
- Wireless:
  - System-on-Chip
  - Mesh Networking Modules
  - Protocols supported include:
    - Bluetooth
    - Proprietary wireless protocols for Sub-GHz and 2.4 GHz frequencies
    - Zigbee
    - Z-Wave for smart home applications
    - Thread networking solutions
    - Amazon Sidewalk
    - Wi-Fi transceivers, transceiver modules, Xpress modules, stand-alone modules
    - Wi-SUN^{®}
- MCUs
  - EFM8 8-bit MCUs (compatible to MCS-51 instruction set)
  - EFM32 32-bit MCUs
- Sensors

== Security technologies ==
Silicon Labs' product portfolio is protected by a range of security measures:

Anti-rollback prevention

- Protects device by preventing the execution of previous versions of authenticated firmware that might carry security flaws

Cryptographic accelerator

Differential Power Analysis (DPA) countermeasures

Protected secret key storage

Public Key Infrastructure

- IoT Device Certificate Authority enabling device-to-device or device-to-server identity authentication

Secure boot

- Secure Boot with Root of Trust and Secure Loader (RTSL) provides additional security for loading initial code to the system microcontroller

Secure debug with lock/unlock

- Access to debug port controlled by a unique lock token generated by signing a revocable unique identifier with a customer generated private key

Secure link

- Encrypting the link between a host processor and radio transceiver or network co-processor (NCP)

Secure programming at manufacturing

Secure Vault

- Integrated hardware and software security technology Features include:
  - Secure device identity
  - Secure key management and storage
  - Advanced tamper detection

True Random Number Generator

== Protocols ==
Silicon Labs technologies support seven wireless protocols.

Bluetooth

Bluetooth software enables developers to utilize Bluetooth LE, Bluetooth 5, Bluetooth 5.1, Bluetooth 5.2, and Bluetooth mesh. Bluetooth SDK can be used to create standalone Bluetooth applications for Wireless Gecko SoCs or modules, or network co-processor (NCP) applications. Products include:

- Bluetooth SoCs
- Certified Bluetooth modules
- Software

Proprietary wireless protocols

Devices cover sub-GHz and 2.4 GHz frequencies, delivering ultra-low power, long range, up to 20dBm output power and different modulation schemes for major frequency bands. Products include:

- Transceivers
- Multi-band wireless SoCs for IoT applications
- Wireless MCPs
- RF synthesizers
- Dynamic Multi-protocol (DMP) for smartphone connectivity in long-range solutions
- SDKs for accelerating proprietary protocol development

Thread

Technologies that enable IP connectivity through self-healing mesh features, native IPv6 based connectivity and different security options. Products include:

- Software stacks
- Development tools
- Modules
- SoCs
- Reference designs

Zigbee

Software stacks and development tools for Zigbee applications, including Mesh Networking SoCs and modules.

Z-Wave

Modules and SoCs for applications in sectors including smart home, hospitality and MDUs, where sensors and battery-operated devices require long range and low power.

Wi-Fi

Wi-Fi SoCs and modules designed for applications requiring low power and good RF performance, such as IoT. Products include:

- Wi-Fi transceivers
- Transceiver modules
- Xpress modules
- Stand-alone modules

Wi-SUN^{®}

Wi-SUN (Wireless Smart Ubiquitous Network) is a field area network (FAN) to enable long-distance connectivity. The Wi-SUN technology aims to simplify LPWAN deployment and enable secure wireless connectivity in applications including advanced metering infrastructure (AMI), street lighting networks, asset management, and parking, air quality, and waste management sensors.

Matter

Matter is a global IoT connectivity standard that builds on top of existing IP-connectivity protocols to enable cross-platform IoT communication, encompassing end products, mobile applications, and cloud services. Silicon Labs wireless devices are available for the development of Matter end products that support Thread, Wi-Fi, and Bluetooth protocols.

Amazon Sidewalk

Amazon Sidewalk is a low-bandwidth, long-range wireless communication protocol developed by Amazon. It uses Bluetooth Low Energy (BLE) for short distance communication,[2] and 900 MHz CSS and FSK for longer distances.

== Industry associations ==
Silicon Labs is a founding member of both the ZigBee Alliance and the Thread Group, and is on the Board of Directors at the Wi-SUN Alliance.

The company is also a member of the Bluetooth Special Interest Group, Wi-Fi Alliance, Z-Wave Alliance and a Gold member of the Open Connectivity Foundation and the RISC-V Foundation.

== Acquisitions ==
- Krypton Isolation Inc. (2000)
- Cygnal Integrated Products (2003)
- Silicon Magike (2005)
- Silembia (2006)
- Integration Associates (2008)
- Silicon Clocks and ChipSensors (2010)
- SpectraLinear (2011)
- Ember Corporation (2012)
- Energy Micro (2013)
- Touchstone Semiconductor (2014)
- Bluegiga and Telegesis (2015)
- Micrium (2016)
- Zentri (2017)
- Z-Wave, acquired from Sigma Designs (2018)
- IEEE 1588 precision time protocol (PTP) software and module assets from Qulsar (2019)
- Redpine Signals' connectivity business (2020)

== Locations ==
Silicon Labs is headquartered in Austin, Texas, with regional offices in Boston, Massachusetts and San Jose, California. The company has also corporate offices in Montreal, Canada; Copenhagen, Denmark; Espoo, Finland; Budapest, Hungary; Oslo, Norway and Singapore.

It has 15 sales offices across the world. These include Boston and San Jose in the US; Beijing, Shanghai, Shenzhen and Wuhan in China; Espoo, Finland; Montigny-le-Bretonneux, France; Munich, Germany; Milan, Italy; Tokyo, Japan; Seoul, South Korea; Singapore; Taipei, Taiwan; and Camberley, the UK.

Silicon Labs has a wireless development center in Hyderabad, India.
