= SCHC =

SCHC may refer to:

- Stichtsche Cricket en Hockey Club, a Dutch multisportclub mainly known for its field hockey
- Static Context Header Compression, an Internet protocol
