= Semtech =

Semiconductor company

Semtech Corporation
- Type: Public
- Traded as: Nasdaq: SMTC; S&P 400 component
- Industry: Semiconductors
- Founded: 1960; 66 years ago in Newbury Park, California
- Headquarters: Camarillo, California, U.S.
- Key people: Dr. Hong Q. Hou(President & CEO)
- Products: Semiconductors
- Revenue: ▲US$869 million (2024)
- Operating income: ▼US$−371 million (2024)
- Net income: ▼US$−371.8 million (2024)
- Total assets: ▼US$1.37 billion (2024)
- Total equity: ▼US$−307 million (2024)
- Number of employees: 1,917 (2024)
- Website: semtech.com
- Footnotes; Financials as of January 28, 2024

Semtech Corporation is an American supplier of analog and mixed-signal semiconductors and advanced algorithms for consumer, enterprise computing, communications and industrial end-markets. It is based in Camarillo, Ventura County, Southern California. It was founded in 1960 in Newbury Park, California. It has 32 locations in 15 countries in North America, Europe, and Asia.

Semtech is the developer of LoRa, a long-range networking initiative for the Internet of Things. As of March 2021, over 178 million devices use LoRa worldwide. LoRa has been used in satellites, tracking of animals, UAV radio control, and natural disaster prediction.

Semtech has been publicly traded since 1967. In 1995, Semtech ranked fifth on the Bloomberg 100 list of top-performing stocks of 1995 on the New York and American stock exchanges and the NASDAQ National Market.

== Products ==
Semtech offers a variety of products, including LoRa, a long-range, low-power networking platform; receivers and transmitters; touch and proximity devices; wireless charging; and power management solutions. Semtech's chips were utilized in products using the Amazon Sidewalk protocol, as well as to monitor water leaks. A collaboration with Unabiz to produce IoT devices that use both Semtech's LoRaWAN as well as Unabiz's Sigfox systems was announced in July 2023. Semtech additionally offers HDMI to SDI converter chips as well as LoRa transceiver with global coverage. Semtech also offers cloud connectivity and Voice over LTE services.

== Acquisitions ==
In December 1999, Semtech bought USAR Systems Inc., a maker of embedded devices for handheld and notebook computers, for $26.7 million in stock.

In March 2012, it bought Gennum Corporation, a supplier of high-speed analog semiconductors, for approximately CA$500 million (US$494 million). In the same month, it acquired Cycleo SAS, a supplier of wireless semiconductor products, for $5 million in cash.

In August 2022, Semtech agreed to buy Canadian technology company Sierra Wireless in an all-cash transaction valued at US$1.2 billion including debt. The acquisition completed in January 2023.
