= LoRaWAN =

Wireless internet protocol

- LoRaWAN logo
- Developed by: Cycleo, Semtech, LoRa Alliance

LoRaWAN is a low-power, wide-area network (LPWAN) protocol that wirelessly connects battery-operated devices to the Internet. LoRaWAN uses LoRa as the physical layer. LoRa can be thought of as the radio signal technology (similar to Wi-Fi or cellular), while LoRaWAN is the protocol and network architecture that manages communication over that signal.

Together, LoRa and LoRaWAN provide a solution for connecting low-power devices over long distances, making them a key technology for the Internet of Things (IoT). The technology is primarily used for applications where small amounts of data need to be transmitted infrequently from hard-to-reach locations, such as in smart agriculture, industrial monitoring, and asset tracking. The technology was originally developed by the French company Cycleo, which was acquired by Semtech in 2012, and the LoRaWAN standard is now managed by the LoRa Alliance.

== LoRaWAN elaboration ==
LoRaWAN network architecture

Representative LoRaWAN deployment, with a Raspberry Pi 4 with LoRaWAN Gateway HAT, and a Dragino SDI-12 to LoRaWAN converter. The Gateway then forwards packets to the network and application server.

While LoRa defines the lower physical layer, LoRaWAN is the system architecture for the network. LoRaWAN defines the communication protocol for managing communication between low-power end-node devices and gateways.

The LoRaWAN network architecture consists of three main components:

- End Devices: These are the small, battery-powered sensors or trackers that are spread out in the field. Each device has a LoRa chip that allows it to transmit small packets of data over long distances using the LoRa radio protocol. Its MAC layer is configured from the Network Server.
- Gateways (Base Stations): A gateway spends most time in receiving mode while pushing those received LoRa frames to a Network Server. A single LoRa gateway can simultaniously listen on multiple channels. For example, a gateway with one SX1301 gateway chip can listen on eight LoRaWAN channels. Commercial gateways typically stack up more of such chips to cater larger channel plans, e.g., to cater 64 LoRaWAN channels in the 915 MHz band. When a gateway receives a LoRa frame from an end-device, it simply forwards that to the Network Server. A key feature of LoRaWAN is that one LoRa frame can be picked up by multiple gateways which are in range to the end-device. All of these gateways will forward this frame to the same Network Server. I.e., LoRaWAN protocol allows multiple gateways to collaboratively listen for the same end-device and deduplication of those received frames occur within the Network Server.
- Network Server: This is a core component of a LoRaWAN network. It receives the data from all the gateways, removes duplicate messages, and then routes that data to the an application server. It can also manage the communication frequencies (channels), SF (the modulation parameter in LoRa modulation that sets the data rate) and transmit power for all end devices. For example, if a nearby LoRaWAN node transmits at an unnecessarily high power, the Network Server can let the end-device know that it can increase the data rate or opt for a lower transmit power to enhance battery life. These suggestions are transmitted back to the end-device immediately following an uplink of the end-device. Applying these suggested settings are however optional and is a choice left to the end-device.

In Summary: end-devices in a LoRaWAN network are asynchronous and transmit whenever new data is made available. Data transmitted by an end-device is received by multiple gateways, which then forward this data to the centralized network server where those frames are then forwarded to the corresponding application server.

=== CSMA for LoRaWAN ===
In the wireless communication, particularly across the IoT applications, collision avoidance is essential for reliable communication and overall spectral efficiency. Previously, LoRaWAN has relied upon ALOHA as the medium access control (MAC) layer protocol, but to improve this, the LoRa Alliance's Technical Recommendation TR013 introduced CSMA-CA. Employing the CAD based CSMA technique specified in TR013 enhances LoRaWAN's spectrum efficiency and ensures more reliable device communication, including in congested environments. TR013 is based on the LMAC and is the first industry-academia collaboration of LoRa Alliance to have resulted in a Technical Recommendation. CSMA is enabled by default in the LoRaWAN codebase and in the firmware of more recent LoRa radios.

== Version history ==
- January 2015: 1.0
- February 2016: 1.0.1
- July 2016: 1.0.2
- October 2017: 1.1, adds Class B
- July 2018: 1.0.3
- October 2020: 1.0.4

== Governance ==
LoRaWAN
- Formation: 2015
- Headquarters: Fremont, California
- Website: lora-alliance.org

The LoRa Alliance is nonprofit organization located in Fremont, California supporting the LoRaWAN standard and deployments in remote or hard-to-reach locations. Members include Actility, Amazon Web Services, Cisco, Everynet, Helium, Kerlink, MachineQ, Microsoft, MikroTik, Minol Zenner, Netze BW, Semtech, Senet, STMicroelectronics, TEKTELIC,Orbiwise SA and The Things Industries. In 2018, the LoRa Alliance had over 100 LoRaWAN network operators in over 100 countries; in 2023, there are nearly 200, providing coverage in nearly every country in the world. On October 1, 2024, Cisco announced it is "exiting the LoRaWAN space" with no planned migration for Cisco LoRaWAN gateways.

== See also ==
- CC430 – an MCU & sub-1 GHz RF transceiver SoC
- Narrowband IoT – narrowband Internet of things
- LTE Cat M1 – Cellular device technology
- MIoTy – sub-GHz LPWAN technology for sensor networks
- SCHC – static context header compression
- Short-range device – Class of radio transmitter
