= Bluegiga =

Finnish wireless technology company

Bluegiga Technologies
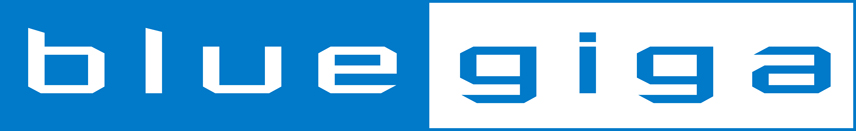
- Company type: Private
- Industry: Telecommunication
- Founded: 2000
- Defunct: February 2015
- Headquarters: Espoo, Finland
- Products: Bluetooth; Bluetooth low energy Wi-Fi; System-on-Module
- Number of employees: 37 (Aug 2012)
- Website: Bluegiga.com

Bluegiga Technologies Ltd. known as Bluegiga, is a Finnish wireless technology company based in Espoo, Finland. Founded in 2000, it has since expanded its offices to Atlanta in USA and Hong Kong. Bluegiga has been a member of the Bluetooth Special Interest Group since it was established and joined Continua Health Alliance in Spring 2008. The company joined Wi-Fi Alliance in the beginning of 2012.

== Products ==
Bluegiga develops and manufactures short range wireless connectivity systems, including Bluetooth modules and access servers, Wi-Fi modules, Bluetooth Smart modules as well as a licensable embedded Bluetooth stack, iWRAP. The products are mainly aimed at adding wireless connectivity to industrial customers' products, rather than being consumer-ready end products by themselves. Common industry sectors that use Bluegiga's products include, Healthcare, automotive, audio, industrial and consumer applications.

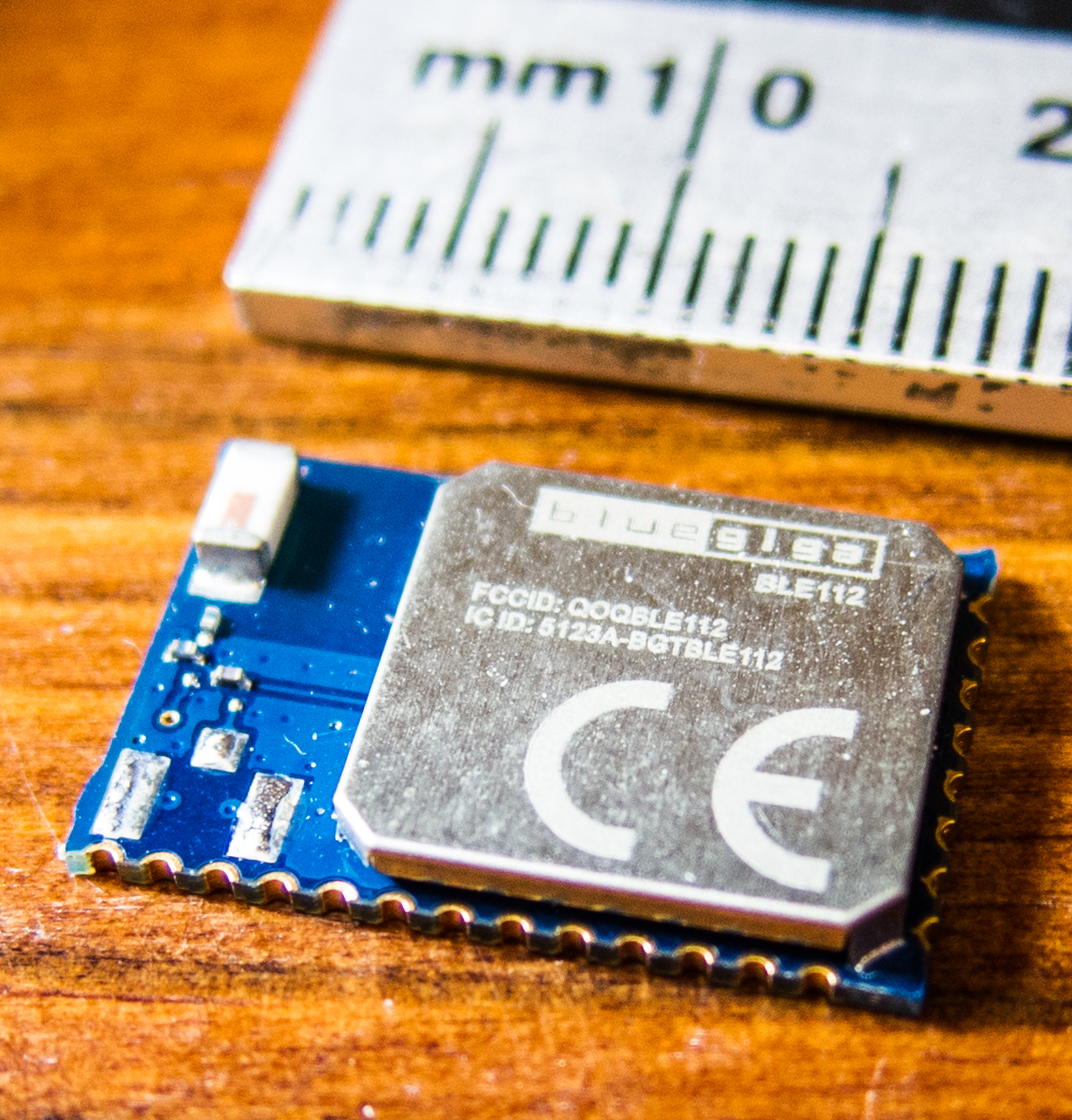
BLE112 Bluetooth Smart Module.

== Acquisitions ==
In February 2015, Bluegiga was acquired by Silicon Labs.

== See also ==
- Michael Kroll's project pages
- Suresh Joshi's Bluegiga-related development pages

== News articles ==
- "Successful financing round for BlueGiga". Telecompaper.
- "Bluegiga provides health device profile for Bluetooth OEM modules". Medical Technology Business Europe.
- "Bluegiga Launches Embedded Wi-Fi® Modules for Professional Applications". Canada Newswire. Archived from the original on July 2, 2012.
- "WT12 Bluetooth Breakout Board". In Mojo.
- "Bluegiga integrates wireless Bluetooth and GSM technologies for M2M applications". PR Web. Archived from the original on March 5, 2016.
- "New Bluetooth 4.0 Development Kit from Rowdy Robot on Kickstarter.com". LabStrip. Archived from the original on June 7, 2012.
