= Helium Network =

Wireless network linked to cryptocurrency

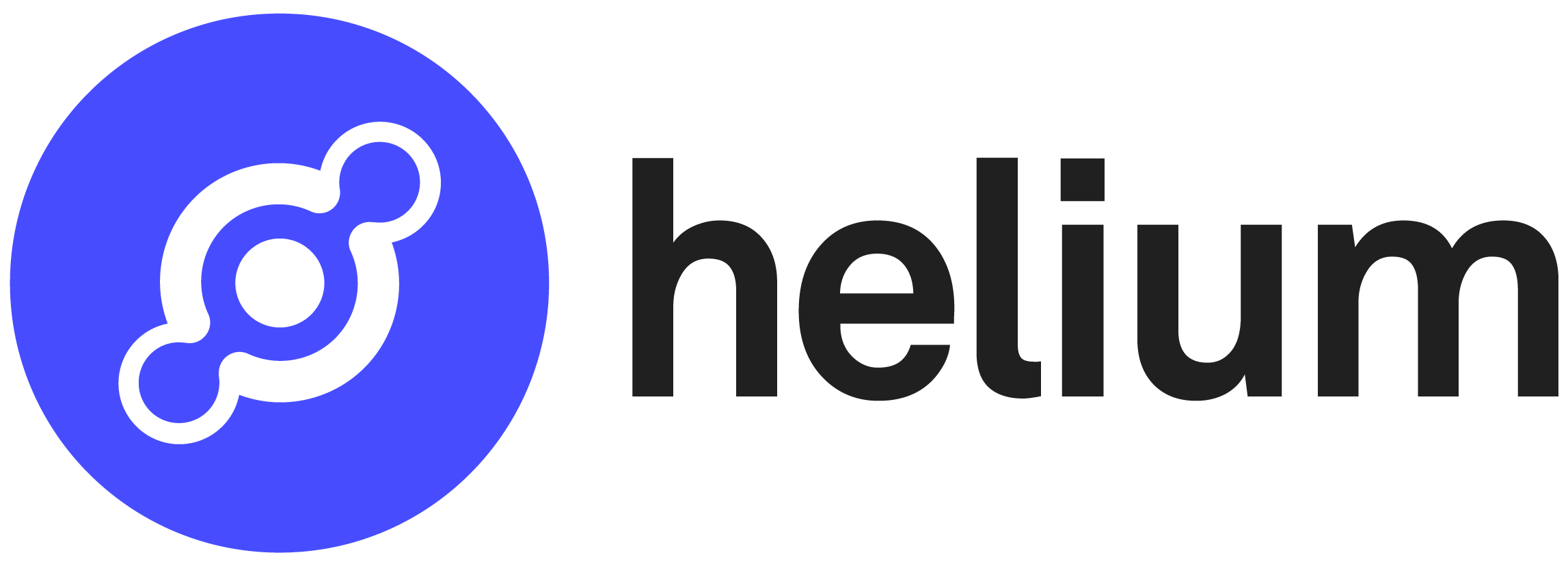

Denominations
- Code: HNT

Development
- Original author: Amir Haleem
- Initial release: 2017 (9 years ago)
- Code repository: https://github.com/helium/
- Development status: Active
- Developer(s): Nova Labs & Helium Foundation

Ledger
- Block explorer: world.helium.com

Website
- Website: helium.com

The Helium Network is a wireless system composed of two distinct networks: one for Internet of things (IoT) devices using LoRaWAN and another for mobile phone coverage using Wi-Fi hotspots.

Both the IoT and Mobile networks are tied to the cryptocurrency Helium Network Token (symbol HNT). Nodes on the networks may be owned and placed by individuals in places like homes or offices, and owners of nodes are rewarded for their participation in the networks in payments of HNT.

== History ==
The Helium Network was begun by Helium, Inc. in 2013, as a network of LoRa gateway hotspots which could be deployed throughout an area by agreements with building owners, typically paid in conventional currency.

In 2017, the company's funds were running low, so it switched to a new strategy: offering individuals payment in cryptocurrency to operate individually owned nodes in their homes or offices. These individually owned nodes were purchased at costs of up to $500 each, and the payments to owners vary based on data usage but can be as low as $0.10 a month. Hotspot operators would also have a vote in the operation of the network.

In 2021, Helium partnered with Dish Network to deploy thousands of Helium hotspots across Dish's nationwide cellular network, further expanding Helium's reach.

In March 2022, Helium Inc. rebranded to Nova Labs Inc. and raised $200 million in a funding round led by Tiger Global Management and Andreessen Horowitz.

In August 2022, Helium integrated with the 5G network. Helium 5G utilized a decentralized approach, building a cellular network powered by new kinds of Helium Hotspots equipped with 5G radios. These hotspots, deployed by individuals or businesses, provided local coverage and relay data within the network.

Reports in July 2022 alleged that Helium falsely had claimed Lime and Salesforce as partners and customers, despite neither company having a formal relationship with Helium. Nova Labs CEO Amir Haleem has disputed these claims.

In 2022, Nova Labs (then operating as Helium Inc.) acquired FreedomFi, a company building open source tools for deploying decentralized 5G networks using CBRS spectrum. The acquisition brought together teams working on community-driven wireless infrastructure, laying the groundwork for Helium’s expansion into cellular networking.

In 2022, the Helium community approved two new tokens: IOT and MOBILE, intended to incentivize participation in the network's IoT and Mobile sub-networks. Both tokens were backed by HNT through a redemption mechanism. Ultimately, the community decided that the arrangement added too much complexity to the network’s economic structure. In January 2025, with the adoption of Helium Improvement Proposal 138 (HIP 138), the network returned to HNT as the primary reward token across all sub-networks, simplifying the system and consolidating utility around a single asset.

In April 2023, the Helium Network migrated from its own proprietary blockchain to the Solana blockchain, following community approval of Helium Improvement Proposal 70 (HIP 70). The move was designed to improve scalability, reduce transaction costs, and enable faster development of new features such as advanced Proof-of-Coverage algorithms.

In 2023, Nova Labs began offering consumer cellular services and related plans under the name Helium Mobile. Helium Mobile users utilize both T-Mobile infrastructure as well as the Helium Network's own Wi-Fi hotspots. Previously focused on building a decentralized 5G network using CBRS spectrum, the Helium community pivoted from CBRS in 2024 to Wi-Fi Hotspots, which integrate more easily with existing technology and enable effective carrier offload.

In November 2024 and March 2025, Harvard Business School published case studies on Helium co-written by professors Jorge Tamayo alongside Escape Velocity (EV3) co-founder Mahesh Ramakrishnan. The case studies discuss Helium's decentralized model and pivot from its initial focus on providing connectivity for IoT devices to WiFi offload for smartphones.

In June 2026 founder Amir Haleem stepped down as Nova Labs CEO to take a new position as Chairman. And their GM of Networks Mario Di Dio stepped up to be the new CEO. Also at the same time, Nova Labs announced the sale of its consumer cellular plan business, Helium Mobile, to the Andrew Yang-owned Noble Mobile.

== Litigation ==
On Jan. 17, 2025, the US Securities and Exchange Commission (SEC) filed a complaint against Nova Labs Inc., the company that developed the Helium Network, alleging that the company raised “millions of dollars from investors through its unregistered sales of securities in the form of “Hotspots” – electronic devices that “mine” one of three Nova Labs crypto assets.” The lawsuit also alleged that Nova Labs misled investors regarding multiple high-profile partnerships. On April 10, 2025, the SEC agreed to dismiss the unregistered security claims and Nova Labs chose to resolve the case efficiently by agreeing to a $200,000 no admit/no deny settlement tied to its Series D equity financing.

== See also ==
- LoRa
- FreedomFi
