= Mioty =

Type of wireless telecommunication wide area network

Mioty is a low-power wide-area network (LPWAN) protocol. It uses telegram splitting, a standardized LPWAN technology in the license-free spectrum. This technology splits a data telegram into multiple sub packets and sends them after applying error correcting codes, in a partly predefined time and frequency pattern. This makes a transmission robust to interferences and packet collisions. It is standardised in the TS 103 357 ETSI. Its uplink operates in the 868 MHz band, license free in Europe, and 916 MHz band in North America. It requires a bandwidth of 200 kHz for two channels (e.g. up- and downlink).

== History and Origins ==
- Research into splitting wireless data transmissions into multiple short telegrams began in 2009 at the Fraunhofer Institute for Integrated Circuits (Fraunhofer IIS), aimed at increasing robustness in low-power networks.
- Fraunhofer IIS filed a German patent in 2013 and subsequently a U.S. patent in 2014 for methods based on that research.
- The trademark MIOTY was registered by Fraunhofer IIS in 2015. In 2024, the mioty Alliance registered mioty (stylized, with a polygon word-and-design mark).
- In June 2018, ETSI published the first complete specification of the TS-UNB protocol as TS 103 357, formalizing the technology underlying mioty.
- In November 2019, the mioty Alliance e.V. was formed by founding members including Fraunhofer IIS, Texas Instruments, Diehl Metering, Diehl Connectivity Solutions, ifm, Ragsol, Stackforce, and WIKA. The Alliance publicly launched in February 2020 at Embedded World in Nuremberg, with the objective of promoting an open, interoperable ecosystem for mioty in IoT applications. By mid-2022, it had grown to 10 full members and 25 associate members.
- In April 2020, Sisvel announced that it would manage a patent-pool for mioty, offering manufacturers a centralized licensing source for mioty-related patents.
- In June 2024, ETSI released TS 103 357-2, a major revision of the TS-UNB standard that further refines the Low Throughput Network (LTN) protocol used by mioty.

== Technology attributes ==
- Long range: The operating range of LPWAN technology varies from a few kilometers in urban areas to over 10 km in rural settings. It can also enable effective data communication in previously infeasible indoor and underground locations.
- Low power: Optimized for power consumption, LPWAN transceivers can run on small, inexpensive batteries for up to 20 years.
- Telegram splitting: (or TSMA, telegram splitting multiple access) Splits the packets of data under transport in small sub-packets at the sensor level. The small packets getting then transmitted over variable frequency and time.
- More than a million packets a day.
- Serving moving clients. It can serve data from clients moving at up to 120 km/h.

== mioty physical layer (PHY) ==
mioty implements an Ultra Narrowband (UNB) physical layer combined with a telegram-splitting multiple access technique (Telegram Splitting, also referred to as TS-UNB) that distributes each message across many short sub-packets transmitted on narrow 2 kHz carriers over different time-frequency slots. The telegram-splitting approach (also called Telegram Splitting Multiple Access, TSMA) breaks a MAC payload (telegram) into multiple sub-packets which are channel-coded, interleaved and transmitted with short on-air durations (≈15 ms per burst) and gaps between bursts. This time-frequency diversity reduces the probability that an interferer corrupts all sub-packets and enables the gateway to reconstruct messages even when a substantial fraction of sub-packets are lost; the specification notes that forward error correction (FEC) can tolerate roughly 50% sub-packet loss in typical configurations.

mioty is specified for operation in worldwide licence-free sub-GHz bands (examples: 868 MHz in Europe, 915–920 MHz / 916 MHz in parts of North America). The PHY uses very narrow 2 kHz channels and explicit time-frequency hopping patterns defined by the TS-UNB profiles in ETSI TS 103 357 and its later revision TS 103 357-2.

In addition to the ETSI specifications, the exact regional frequency allocations, channel plans and regulatory constraints for mioty deployments are defined in the mioty Regional Radio Profiles document, which is maintained and regularly updated by the Technical Committee of the mioty Alliance. These profiles ensure compliance with regional spectrum regulations and specify operational parameters for each country or regulatory domain.

For the European region, mioty typically operates under the 1% duty-cycle limitations defined by ETSI EN 300 220, using narrowband TS-UNB channels combined with time–frequency hopping schemes to maximize reliability within these constraints. In contrast, for the United States, mioty uses the US0W profile, which operates under the FCC Part 15 frequency-hopping rules. This mode allows continuous uplink messaging while respecting the FCC dwell-time requirements, enabling significantly higher throughput and message density than duty-cycle-restricted bands.

Key PHY design elements include data whitening, convolutional channel coding (FEC), interleaving, pilot insertion and a modulation scheme optimised for short coherent bursts; frame and sub-packet formats and the time-frequency patterns for core and extension frames are described in the mioty physical layer specification and the ETSI TS-UNB documents.

Compared with other LPWAN PHY approaches (for example LoRaWAN's chirp spread spectrum or typical narrowband schemes used for NB-IoT uplinks), mioty emphasises distributed short bursts and time-frequency diversity rather than long single-packet transmissions or spreading a packet over a long chirp. This trade-off yields improved robustness to narrowband and intermittent interferers, higher aggregate capacity in dense deployments and enhanced mobility tolerance in many scenarios.

Practical consequences documented in the technical literature include low per-message energy (examples in the specification show µAh per message figures under typical assumptions and projected multi-year battery lifetimes for low reporting rates), long range (several kilometres in urban settings and up to ≈15 km in flat terrain under favourable conditions), and support for mobile end nodes at vehicular speeds when processed by a sufficiently capable base-station receiver.

== mioty MAC and higher layers ==
The mioty MAC and higher-layer documents define how application data are mapped to the telegram-splitting PHY, how addressing and security are managed, and how medium access, acknowledgements and retransmissions are coordinated. The MAC specification supports a star topology in which end devices transmit uplink telegrams asynchronously; downlinks are delivered only in response to uplink transmissions and are scheduled by the base station and service-center(s) to respect regulatory duty-cycle limits and network capacity constraints.

Primary MAC/LLC features documented in the specification include:

- Addressing and authentication: devices are identified with persistent EUI-64 identifiers; the MAC carries compact address hints and authentication tags so that base stations can resolve device IDs and verify message integrity on partial receptions.
- Network and application security: the stack defines network-level encryption (session keys, AES-128 based primitives) and supports application-level end-to-end encryption, with key management performed via the network service centre.
- Acknowledgements and retransmissions: the MAC supports acknowledgement strategies and retransmission management that leverage the PHY’s FEC and sub-packet diversity; because the PHY can reconstruct messages from partial receptions, the MAC may avoid unnecessary retransmissions in many collision or interference cases.
- Timing and duty-cycle compliance: uplink transmissions are asynchronous but the service-center and base station coordinate downlinks and duty-cycle budgets to comply with regional regulations; the MAC tracks timestamps and assigns downlink windows approximately seconds after an uplink reception to ensure correct delivery and regulatory compliance.
- Logical Link Control (LLC): a separate LLC layer handles attachment/detachment, over-the-air management, and service-center interactions for device provisioning and de-duplication of messages received by multiple base stations.
- Comparative behaviour versus other LPWAN MACs: unlike some LPWAN protocols whose MAC layer provides adaptive data-rate or tight channel coordination (for example certain LoRaWAN network server features), many of mioty’s capacity and reliability properties stem from the telegram-splitting PHY (time-frequency diversity and strong FEC) rather than from heavy MAC-layer channel arbitration. This design favours massive concurrent access and interference resilience in dense sensor deployments.
- Performance, capacity and mobility: mioty documentation gives numerical performance examples (e.g., single-gateway capacities such as ≈3,500,000 messages/day within 200 kHz of spectrum under stated assumptions, projected multi-year battery lifetimes for low reporting intervals, and mobility support up to vehicular speeds when the base-station receiver implements advanced processing). These figures are presented as examples in the Fraunhofer/mioty technical documents and ETSI TS-UNB profiles and depend on message size, duty-cycle limits and regional regulations.
- Standards and ecosystem: the TS-UNB protocol and telegram-splitting concept are formalised in ETSI TS 103 357 (initial release) and the updated TS 103 357-2; the mioty Alliance (Fraunhofer IIS among its originators) publishes the public technical documents that describe PHY, MAC and higher layers and acts as an industry forum to promote interoperability and ecosystem adoption.

== Available mioty Service Centers / Application Centers ==
In addition to the Fraunhofer Service Center / Application Center, there are now also mioty Alliance members offering alternative Service & Application Centers. The include the following providers, among others:

Platform	Integrated mioty Service Center	Integrated mioty Application Center	Hybrid LPWAN
Pallax Daten- & IoT-Platform	yes, natively integrated	yes, natively integrated	yes (LoRaWAN)
LORIOT Network Management System	yes	no	yes (LoRaWAN)
Akenza IoT Platform	no	no	yes (Third-Party-Integrations)

Conclusion: Full native mioty support provided by Pallax. LORIOT is well-suited for integration with existing Application Centers. Akenza requires an external mioty Service and Application Center.

== Applications ==
mioty is designed for large-scale, interference-resistant IoT deployments where other LPWAN technologies may reach limitations such as spectrum congestion, high collision rates or reduced capacity in dense urban and industrial environments.

Its robustness, scalability and tolerance for interference make it suitable for a wide range of monitoring and automation tasks.

Typical application areas include:

- Safety-critical monitoring, such as lone-worker protection, emergency alert systems or underground industrial environments, where robust uplink delivery is required even under harsh radio conditions.
- Utility metering, including water, gas and heat meters, as well as smart-city networked meters. Many deployments use mioty due to its long-range coverage and low power requirements.
- Industrial monitoring, such as vibration sensing, power monitoring, and factory automation in RF-challenging environments.
- Integration with metering standards, particularly through the inclusion of the mioty PHY in the OMS 5 LPWAN specification via "OMS Splitting Mode", enabling interoperable smart-metering solutions.
- Industrial communication systems, supported by collaboration agreements with automation consortia such as the IO-Link Community, enabling the use of mioty as a wireless transport layer in Industry 4.0 systems.
- Asset tracking and positioning in large industrial areas, ports or airports. mioty can support hybrid positioning methods, combining GNSS with TSMA-based link metrics, which provide additional ranging information from the telegram-splitting process.
- Smart-city and smart-building infrastructure, including environmental monitoring, leakage detection, fire protection and air-quality sensing.
- Hybrid LPWAN deployments, where cities or utilities combine mioty with LoRaWAN to leverage both ecosystems. Hybrid gateways and dual-technology LPWAN products are commercially available to support these deployments.

== See also ==
- Internet of Things
- European Telecommunications Standards Institute
- Low-power wide-area network
