= Amazon Sidewalk =

Mesh wireless network developed by Amazon

- Communication protocol
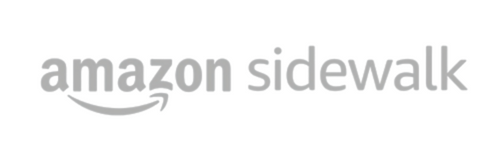
- Purpose: Internet of things long-range connectivity
- Developer: Amazon Inc.
- Based on: Bluetooth low energy, LoRa
- Hardware: Ring Floodlight Cam (2019), Ring Spotlight Cam Wired (2019), Ring Spotlight Cam Mount (2019), Echo (3rd gen and newer), Echo Dot (3rd gen and newer), Echo Dot for Kids (3rd gen and newer), Echo Dot with Clock (3rd gen and newer), Echo Plus (all generations), Echo Show (2nd gen), Echo Show 5, 8, 10 (all generations), Echo Spot, Echo Studio, Echo Input, Echo Flex.
- Website: www.amazon.com/Amazon-Sidewalk/b?ie=UTF8&node=21328123011

Amazon Sidewalk is a low-bandwidth long-range wireless communication protocol developed by Amazon. It uses Bluetooth Low Energy (BLE) for short distance communication, and 900 MHz LoRa and other frequencies for longer distances.

== History ==
The idea of the Amazon Sidewalk wireless network originated from a startup called Iotera, founded by Rob Barton and Ben Wild. They launched the idea of a crowd sourced mesh network through a Kickstarter campaign in 2014. Iotera was acquired by Ring Home Security in late 2017 and after Ring was acquired by Amazon in 2018, the Sidewalk project began building on top of the Iotera technology. In September, 2019, Amazon announced the Sidewalk network and a domestic pet collar called Fetch (developed together with Tile) as the first device which would use the network. The network is composed of existing customers' Echo smart speakers which act as the bridges between Sidewalk and the Internet.

In September 2020, Amazon started seeking hardware developers to partner and develop devices for the network.

In May 2021, Amazon and Tile announced plans to use Sidewalk to compete with the AirTag tracker device and associated location service from Apple. CareBand started a pilot with Sidewalk to support people living with dementia in smart neighborhoods.

Amazon launched the Sidewalk network in the US on June 8, 2021.

In March 2023, Amazon opened the network up for outside developers to access, providing free test kits for developers to build Sidewalk devices. They stated that more than 90% of the U.S. population was covered by the Sidewalk network.

== Reception ==
Amazon Echo devices have Sidewalk enabled by default and do not inform their owner about it. The feature can be disabled via the official app.

A number of prominent news publishers, including The Guardian, ArsTechnica, CNET, PCMag, Click2Houston, and Bleeping Computer, expressed concern with opt-out nature of the network and published guides how to disable Amazon Sidewalk.

Amazon stated that "the maximum bandwidth of a Sidewalk Bridge to the Sidewalk server is 80 Kbps, which is about 1/40th [2.5%] of the bandwidth used to stream a typical high definition video." This comparison is misleading for ADSL connections with upstream bandwidth more limited than downstream bandwidth: 80 Kbps approaches 20% of the capacity of a 448 Kbps uplink.

== Technology ==
Amazon Sidewalk amalgamates multiple physical-layer wireless networking protocols and presents them into a single application layer they call "Sidewalk Application Layer".

Transmission technologies:

- Bluetooth Low Energy for short distances and battery efficiency
- LoRa for long-range low-power communication
- Frequency-shift keying at 900 MHz, intended for interacting with legacy home appliances like garage door openers

== Devices ==
The following devices support Amazon Sidewalk:

- Amazon Echo devices
- Ring doorbells and cameras
- CareBand wearables for people living with dementia
- Fetch, an upcoming pet collar from Tile

== See also ==
- LoRa
- Zigbee
- Weightless
- Mass surveillance
