= IoMT =

IoMT may refer to:

- Internet of Military Things, networked devices for combat operations and warfare in the Internet of things
- Internet of Media Things, networked digital media systems in the Internet of things using the international standard ISO/IEC 23093 of the Moving Picture Experts Group (MPEG)
- Internet of Medical Things, networked medical devices in the Internet of things
