= OMM =

OMM may refer to:

- O'Melveny & Myers, a US law firm with a worldwide practice
- Object memory model, a structure model for digital object memories
- The Observer Music Monthly, the British monthly music magazine found in The Observer newspaper
- Obstacle mobility model, a type of mobility model
- Of Mice and Men, a novella written by Nobel Prize-winning author John Steinbeck
- Of Mice & Men (band), (often abbreviated OM&M) an American metalcore band
- Of Monsters and Men, an Icelandic indie band
- Old Man Murray, a gaming website
- OMM, a godlike character with a visual representation resembling Jesus in the film THX 1138
- One Magnificent Morning, an American programming block that airs Saturday mornings on the owned-and-operated stations and affiliates of The CW
- The One Million Masterpiece, the world's largest collaborative art project
- The Original Mountain Marathon, a multi-day running event and a precursor to adventure racing
- One Million Moms, a U.S. conservative group
- Open music model, a business model for the digital distribution of music
- The QualiPSo OpenSource Maturity Model
- Order of Military Merit (Canada), a Canadian military honour (post-nominal letters)
- Organisation météorologique mondiale, French for World Meteorological Organization
- Organização da Mulher Moçambicana, Portuguese for Organization of Mozambican Women
- Osteopathic manipulative medicine, a core technique of osteopathy and osteopathic medicine in the United States
- Outer mitochondrial membrane

== See also ==
- Om, a mantra and mystical Sanskrit sound of Hindu origin
