= Fluidmesh Networks =

- Industry: Computer networking
- Founded: January 2005; 21 years ago
- Fate: Acquired by Cisco Systems
- Headquarters: Brooklyn, NY and Milan
- Key people: Umberto Malesci, CEO, Cosimo Malesci, EVP Sales, Alessandro Erta, CTO, Andrea Orioli, VP Operations
- Website: http://www.fluidmesh.com

Fluidmesh Networks was a hardware and software manufacturer of wireless point-to-point networks, wireless point-to-multipoint networks, and wireless mesh networks. Fluidmesh products are used in video-surveillance, enterprise, industrial, railway, maritime, and military projects.

== Corporate history ==
Fluidmesh was founded in 2005 by four Italian engineers: Umberto Malesci, Cosimo Malesci, Andrea Orioli, and Torquato Bertani. Fluidmesh was a spin-off company from MIT where Umberto Malesci and Cosimo Malesci were graduate students in the Department of Engineering. In 2005, Umberto Malesci was a graduate student working at the MIT Computer Science and Artificial Intelligence Laboratory with Prof. Samuel Madden (MIT) when he developed Fluidmesh's initial software based on the Roofnet open-source project leveraging Click Modular Router. The Company was initially incubated at the Politecnico di Milano, in Milan, Italy. Over the years, Fluidmesh Networks expanded into the United States, Europe, the Middle East and Latin America, and obtained exposure on the Italian national press and television as a successful example of innovation-driven entrepreneurship in the high tech space. Within ten years, Fluidmesh had sold and installed approximately 24,000 miles of wireless links.

In 2010, Fluidmesh partnered with CCTV camera manufacturer, Pelco.

In April 2011, Fluidmesh Networks announced it had been acquired by Generation 3 Capital and Waveland Investments, two private equity firms based in Chicago.

In 2016, Fluidmesh Networks and Cisco announced a partnership to combine Cisco Connected Rail Solutions and Fluidmesh train-to-ground wireless technology into a single solution.

On April 6, 2020, Cisco announced its intent to acquire Fluidmesh. The acquisition was completed July 7, 2020.

== Products and services ==
- Trackside WiFi and Mobile Connectivity for Trains and Railroads
- Internet of Things (IoT) for Vessels and Maritime Applications
- Wireless Backhaul for fixed wireless networks
