= Internet of Military Things =

Class of Internet of things for warfare

The Internet of Military Things (IoMT) is a class of Internet of things for combat operations and warfare. It is a complex network of interconnected entities, or "things", in the military domain that continually communicate with each other to coordinate, learn, and interact with the physical environment to accomplish a broad range of activities in a more efficient and informed manner. The concept of IoMT is largely driven by the idea that future military battles will be dominated by machine intelligence and cyber warfare and will likely take place in urban environments. By creating a miniature ecosystem of smart technology capable of distilling sensory information and autonomously governing multiple tasks at once, the IoMT is conceptually designed to offload much of the physical and mental burden that warfighters encounter in a combat setting.

Over time, several different terms have been introduced to describe the use of IoT technology for reconnaissance, environment surveillance, unmanned warfare and other combat purposes. These terms include the Military Internet of Things (MIoT), the Internet of Battle Things, and the Internet of Battlefield Things (IoBT).

== Overview ==
The Internet of Military Things encompasses a large range of devices that possess intelligent physical sensing, learning, and actuation capabilities through virtual or cyber interfaces that are integrated into systems. These devices include items such as sensors, vehicles, robots, UAVs, human-wearable devices, biometrics, munitions, armor, weapons, and other smart technology. In general, IoMT devices can generally be classified into one of four categories (but the devices are meant to be ubiquitous enough to form a data fabric):

- Data-carrying device: A device attached to a physical thing that indirectly connects it to the larger communication network.
- Data-capturing device: A reader/writer device capable of interacting with physical things.
- Sensing and actuating device: A device that can detect or measure information related to the surrounding environment and converts it into a digital electronic signal or a physical operation.
- General device: A device embedded with processing and communication capabilities that can exchange information with the larger network.

In addition to connecting different electronic devices to a unified network, researchers have also suggested the possibility of incorporating inanimate and innocuous objects like plants and rocks into the system by fitting them with sensors that will turn them into information gathering points. Such efforts fall in line with projects related to the development of electronic plants, or e-Plants.

Proposed examples of IoMT applications include tactical reconnaissance, smart management of resources, logistics support (i.e. equipment and supply tracking), smart city monitoring, and data warfare. Several nations, as well as NATO officials, have expressed Interest in the potential military benefits of IoT technology.

== History ==
Advancements in IoMT technology largely stemmed from military efforts to bolster the development of sensor networks and low-power computing platforms during the 1960s for defense applications. During the Cold War, the U.S. military pioneered the use of wireless sensor network technologies to detect and track Soviet submarines. One example was the Sound Surveillance System (SOSUS), a network of underwater acoustic sensors, i.e. hydrophones, placed throughout the Atlantic and Pacific Oceans to act as underwater listening posts for above-ground facilities. Much of the sensor and networking technologies that the U.S. Department of Defense (DoD) developed during this time period ultimately served as the foundation for modern IoT systems. Critically, the DoD helped set the stage for future IoT research in the late 1960s with the creation of ARPANET, an early precursor to the Internet that geographically dispersed military scientists used to share data.

In the 1980s, the Defense Advanced Projects Agency (DARPA) formally partnered with academic researchers at the Massachusetts Institute of Technology (MIT) and Carnegie Mellon University to further develop distributed, wireless sensor networks. From there, research into wireless sensor technologies spread throughout the civilian research community and eventually found use for industrial applications such as power distribution, wastewater treatment, and factory automation. During this time period, the DoD also invested heavily in the miniaturization of integrated circuits in order to embed various objects with tiny computer chips. As a result of their funding, the commercial microelectronics industry was able to recover when it faced potential decline at the time.

By the late 1990s, the Department of Defense had announced plans for “network-centric” warfare that integrated the physical, information, and cognitive domains to enhance information sharing and collaboration. Examples of projects guided by this goal include the Nett Warrior (formerly known as the Ground Soldier System or Mounted Soldier System) and the Force XXI Battle Command Brigade and Below communication platform, both of which were prevalent in the early 2000s.

However, interest in IoT research in the military started to wane as commercial industry surged ahead with new technology. While DoD continued research into advanced sensors, intelligent information processing systems, and communication networks, few military systems have taken full advantage of the IoT stack such as networked sensors and automated-response technology largely due to security concerns. As of 2019, research in modern IoT technology within the military started to regain a considerable amount of support from the U.S. Army, Navy, and Air Force.

== Programs ==
Several initiatives were formed by the Department of Defense in order to bolster IoT research in the military domain as well as to reduce the current gap in progress between military and industry applications.

=== The Connected Soldier ===
The Connected Soldier project was a research initiative supported by the U.S. Army Natick Soldier Research, Development and Engineering Center (NSRDEC) that focused on creating intelligent body gear. The project aimed to establish an internet of things for each soldier by integrating wideband radio, biosensors, and smart wearable systems as standard equipment. These devices served not only to monitor the soldier's physiological status but also to communicate mission data, surveillance intelligence, and other important information to nearby military vehicles, aircraft, and other troops.

=== Internet of Battlefield Things (IoBT) ===
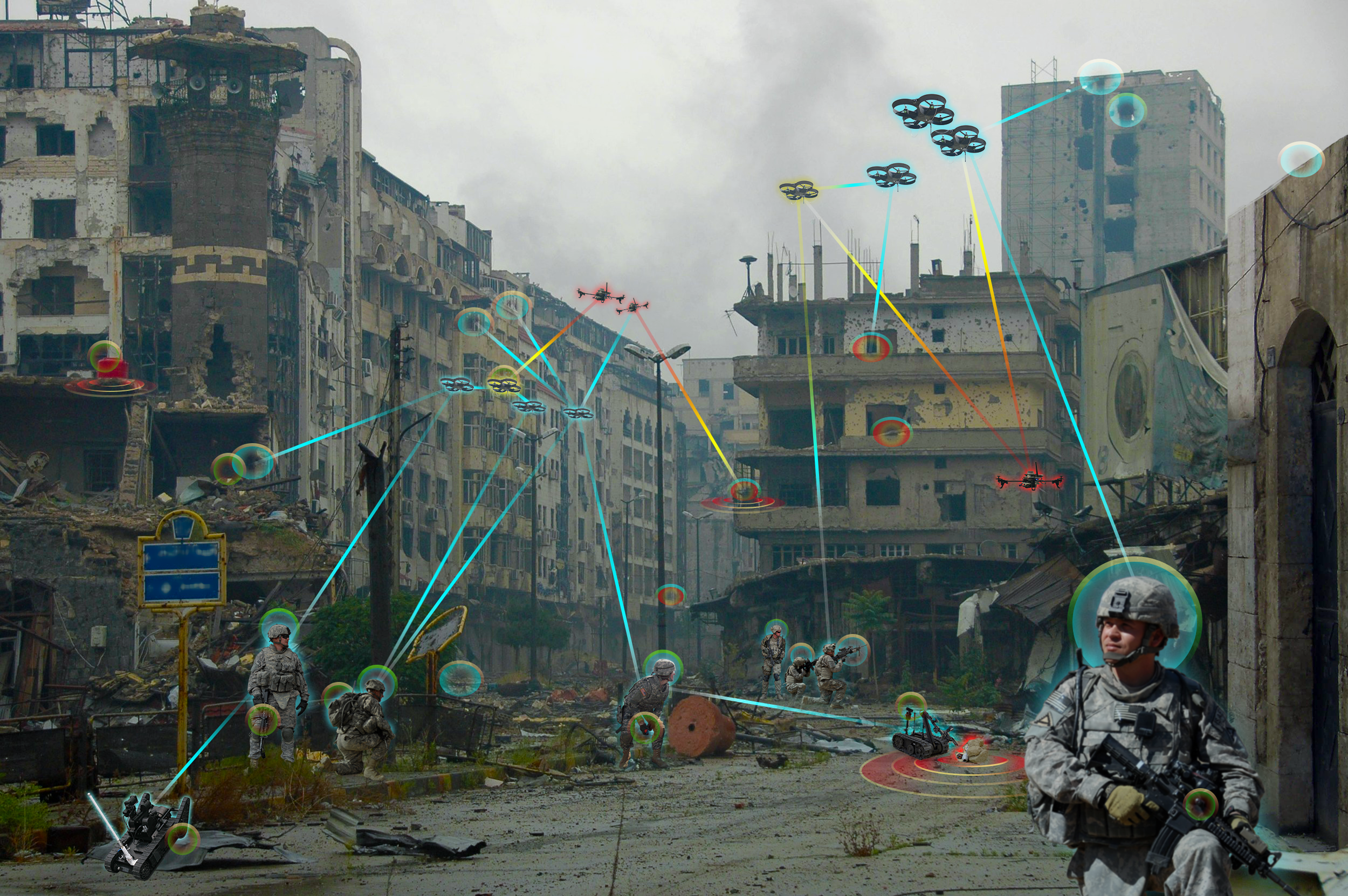
Internet of Battlefield Things technology in an unstructured, chaotic urban environment

In 2016, the U.S. Army Research Laboratory (ARL) created the Internet of Battlefield Things (IoBT) project in response to the U.S. Army's operational outline for 2020 to 2040, titled “Winning in a Complex World.” In the outline, the Department of Defense announced its goals to keep up with the technological advances of potential adversaries by turning its attention away from low-tech wars and instead focusing on combat in more urban areas. Acting as a detailed blueprint for what ARL suspected future warfare may entail, the IoBT project pushed for better integration of IoT technology in military operations in order to better prepare for techniques such as electronic warfare that may lie ahead.

In 2017, ARL established the Internet of Battlefield Things Collaborative Research Alliance (IoBT-CRA) to bring together industry, university, and government researchers to advance the theoretical foundations of IoBT systems.

According to ARL, the IoBT was primarily designed to interact with the surrounding environment by acquiring information about the environment, acting upon it, and continually learning from these interactions. As a consequence, research efforts focused on sensing, actuation, and learning challenges. In order for the IoBT to function as intended, the following prerequisite conditions must first be met in regard to technological capability, structural organization, and military implementation.

==== Communication ====
All entities in the IoBT must be able to properly communicate information to one another even with differences in architectural design and makeup. While future commercial internet of things may exhibit a lack of uniform standards across different brands and manufacturers, entities in IoBT must remain compatible despite displaying extreme heterogeneity. In other words, all electronic equipment, technology, or other commercial offerings accessed by military personnel must share the same language or at least have “translators” that make the transfer and processing of different types of information possible. In addition, the IoBT must be capable of temporarily incorporating available networked devices and channels that it does not own for its own use, especially if doing so is advantageous to the system (e.g. making use of existing civilian networking infrastructure in military operations in a megacity). At the same time, the IoBT must take into consideration the varying degree of trustworthiness of all the networks it leverages.

Timing will be critical in the success of IoBT. The speed of communication, computation, machine learning, inference, and actuation between entities are vital to many mission tasks, as the system must know which type of information to prioritize. Scalability will also serve as an important factor in the operation since the network must be flexible enough to function at any size.

==== Learning ====
The success of the IoBT framework often hinges on the effectiveness of the mutual collaboration between the human agents and the electronic entities in the network. In a tactical environment, the electronic entities will be tasked with a wide range of objectives from collecting information to executing cyber actions against enemy systems. In order for these technologies to perform those functions effectively, they must be able to not only ascertain the goals of the human agents as they change but also demonstrate a significant level of autonomous self-organization to adjust to the rapidly changing environment. Unlike commercial network infrastructures, the adoption of IoT in the military domain must take into consideration the extreme likelihood that the environment may be intentionally hostile or unstable, which will require a high degree of intelligence to navigate.

As a result, the IoBT technology must be capable of incorporating predictive intelligence, machine learning, and neural network in order to understand the intent of the human users and determine how to fulfill that intent without the process of micromanaging each and every component of the system.

According to ARL, maintaining information dominance will rely on the development of autonomous systems that can operate outside its current state of total dependence on human control. A key focus of IoBT research is the advancement of machine learning algorithms to provide the network with decision-making autonomy. Rather than having one system at the core of the network functioning as the central intelligence component dictating the actions of the network, the IoBT will have intelligence distributed throughout the network. Therefore, individual components can learn, adapt, and interact with each other locally as well as update behaviors and characteristics automatically and dynamically on a global scale to suit the operation as the landscape of warfare constantly evolves. In the context of IoT, the incorporation of artificial intelligence into the sheer volume of data and entities involved in the network will provide an almost infinite number of possibilities for behavior and technological capability in the real world.

In a tactical environment, the IoBT must be able to perform various types of learning behaviors to adapt to the rapidly changing conditions. One area that received considerable attention is the concept of meta-learning, which strives to determine how machines can learn how to learn. Having such a skill would allow the system to avoid fixating on pretrained absolute notions on how it should perceive and act whenever it enters a new environment. Uncertainty quantification models have also generated interest in IoBT research since the system's ability to determine its level of confidence in its own predictions based on its machine learning algorithms may provide some much needed context whenever important tactical decisions need to be made.

The IoBT should also demonstrate a sophisticated level of situation awareness and artificial intelligence that will allow the system to autonomously perform work based on limited information. A primary goal is to teach the network how to correctly infer the complete picture of a situation while measuring relatively few variables. As a result, the system must be capable of integrating the vast amount and variety of data that it regularly collects into its collective intelligence while functioning in a continuous state of learning at multiple time scales, simultaneously learning from past actions while acting in the present and anticipating future events.

The network must also account for unforeseen circumstances, errors, or breakdowns and be able to reconfigure its resources to recover at least a limited level of functionality. However, some components must be prioritized and structured to be more resilient to failure than others. For instance, networks that carry important information such as medical data must never be at risk of shutdown.

==== Cognitive Accessibility ====
For semi-autonomous components, the human cognitive bandwidth serves as a notable constraint for the IoBT due to its limitations in processing and deciphering information generated by the nodes in the network.. Physical limitations in human mental capacity and attention introduces engineering challenges for IoBT/IoMT, the network must rapidly transform information produced by each node, into reasonably sized packets of essential information. the scale of network itself poses technical challenges. the IoBT is envisioned as a network of tens of thousands of nodes. a simple network of physiological sensors (nodes) alone, is designed to sample data every 12 seconds and broadcasts 240-bit messages at 2400 baud as described in Data Management for Sensor Networks.

A key risk of IoBT is the possibility that devices could communicate negligibly useful information that eats up the human's valuable time and attention or even propagate inappropriate information that misleads human individuals into performing actions that lead to adverse or unfavorable outcomes. At the same time, the system will stagnate if the human entities doubt the accuracy of the information provided by the IoBT technology. As a result, the IoBT must operate in a manner that is extremely convenient and easy to understand to the humans without compromising the quality of the information it provides them.

=== Mosaic Warfare ===
Mosaic Warfare is a term coined by former DARPA Strategic Technology Office director Tom Burns and former deputy director Dan Patt to describe a “systems of systems” approach to military warfare that focuses on re-configuring defense systems and technologies so that they can be fielded rapidly in a variety of different combinations for different tasks. Designed to emulate the adaptable nature of the lego blocks and mosaic art form, Mosaic Warfare was promoted as a strategy to confuse and overwhelm adversary forces by deploying low-cost adaptable technological expendable weapon systems that can play multiple roles and coordinate actions with one another, complicating the decision-making process for the enemy. This method of warfare arose as a response to the current monolithic system in the military, which relies on a centralized command-and-control structure fraught with vulnerable single-point communications and the development of a few highly capable systems that are too important to risk losing in combat.

The concept of Mosaic Warfare existed within DARPA since 2017 and contributed to the development of various technology programs such as the System of Systems Integration Technology and Experimentation (SoSIT), which led to the development of a network system that allows previously disjointed ground stations and platforms to transmit and translate data between one another.

=== Ocean of Things ===
In 2017, DARPA announced the creation of a new program called the Ocean of Things, which planned to apply IoT technology on a grand scale in order to establish a persistent maritime situational awareness over large ocean areas. According to the announcement, the project would involve the deployment of thousands of small, commercially available floats. Each float would contain a suite of sensors that collect environmental data—like sea surface temperature and sea state—and activity data, such as the movement of commercial vessels and aircraft. All the data collected from these floats would then be transmitted periodically to a cloud network for storage and real-time analysis. Through this approach, DARPA aimed to create an extensive sensor network that can autonomously detect, track, and identify both military, commercial, and civilian vessels as well as indicators of other maritime activity.

The Ocean of Things project focused primarily on the design of the sensor floats and the analytic techniques that would be involved in organizing and interpreting the incoming data as its two main objectives. For the float design, the vessel had to be able to withstand the harsh ocean conditions for at least a year while being made out of commercially available components that cost less than $500 each in total. In addition, the floats could not pose any danger to passing vessels and had to be made out of environmentally safe materials so that it could safely dispose of itself in the ocean after completing its mission. In regards to the data analytics, the project concentrated on developing cloud-based software that could collect, process, and transmit data about the environment and their own condition using a dynamic display.

== Security concerns ==
One of the largest potential dangers of IoMT technology is the risk of both adversarial threats and system failures that could compromise the entire network. Since the crux of the IoMT concept is to have every component of the network—sensors, actuators, software, and other electronic devices—connected together to collect and exchange data, poorly protected IoT devices are vulnerable to attacks which may expose large amounts of confidential information. Furthermore, a compromised IoMT network is capable of causing serious, irreparable damage in the form of corrupted software, disinformation, and leaked intelligence.

According to the U.S. Department of Defense, security remains a top priority in IoT research. The IoMT must be able to foresee, avoid, and recover from attempts by adversary forces to attack, impair, hijack, manipulate, or destroy the network and the information that it holds. The use of jamming devices, electronic eavesdropping, or cyber malware may pose a serious risk to the confidentiality, integrity, and availability of the information within the network. Furthermore, the human entities may also be targeted by disinformation campaigns in order to foster distrust in certain elements of the IoMT. Since IoMT technology may be used in an adversarial setting, researchers must account for the possibility that a large number of sources may become compromised to the point where threat-assessing algorithms may use some of those compromised sources to falsely corroborate the veracity of potentially malicious entities.

Minimizing the risks associated with IoT devices will likely require a large-scale effort by the network to maintain impenetrable cybersecurity defenses as well as employ counterintelligence measures that thwart, subvert, or deter potential threats. Examples of possible strategies include the use of “disposable” security, where devices that are believed to be potentially compromised by the enemy are simply discarded or disconnected from the IoMT, and honeynets that mislead enemy eavesdroppers. Since adversary forces are expected to adapt and evolve their strategies for infiltrating the IoMT, the network must also undergo a continuous learning process that autonomously improves anomaly detection, pattern monitoring, and other defensive mechanisms.

Secure data storage serves as one of the key points of interest for IoMT research. Since the IoMT system is predicted to produce an immense volume of information, attention was directed toward new approaches to maintaining data properly and regulating protected access that don't allow for leaks or other vulnerabilities. One potential solution that was proposed by The Pentagon was Comply to Connect (C2C), a network security platform that autonomously monitored device discovery and access control in order to keep pace with the exponentially-growing network of entities.

In addition to the risks of digital interference and manipulation by hackers, concerns have also been expressed regarding the availability of strong wireless signals in remote combat locations. The lack of a constant internet connection was shown to limit the utility and usability of certain military devices that depend on reliable reception.

== See also ==
- Internet of Autonomous Things
- Internet of Things
- Smart munitions
- Edge computing
- Biometrics
- Cyberwarfare
