= IoBT-CRA =

Military research initiative

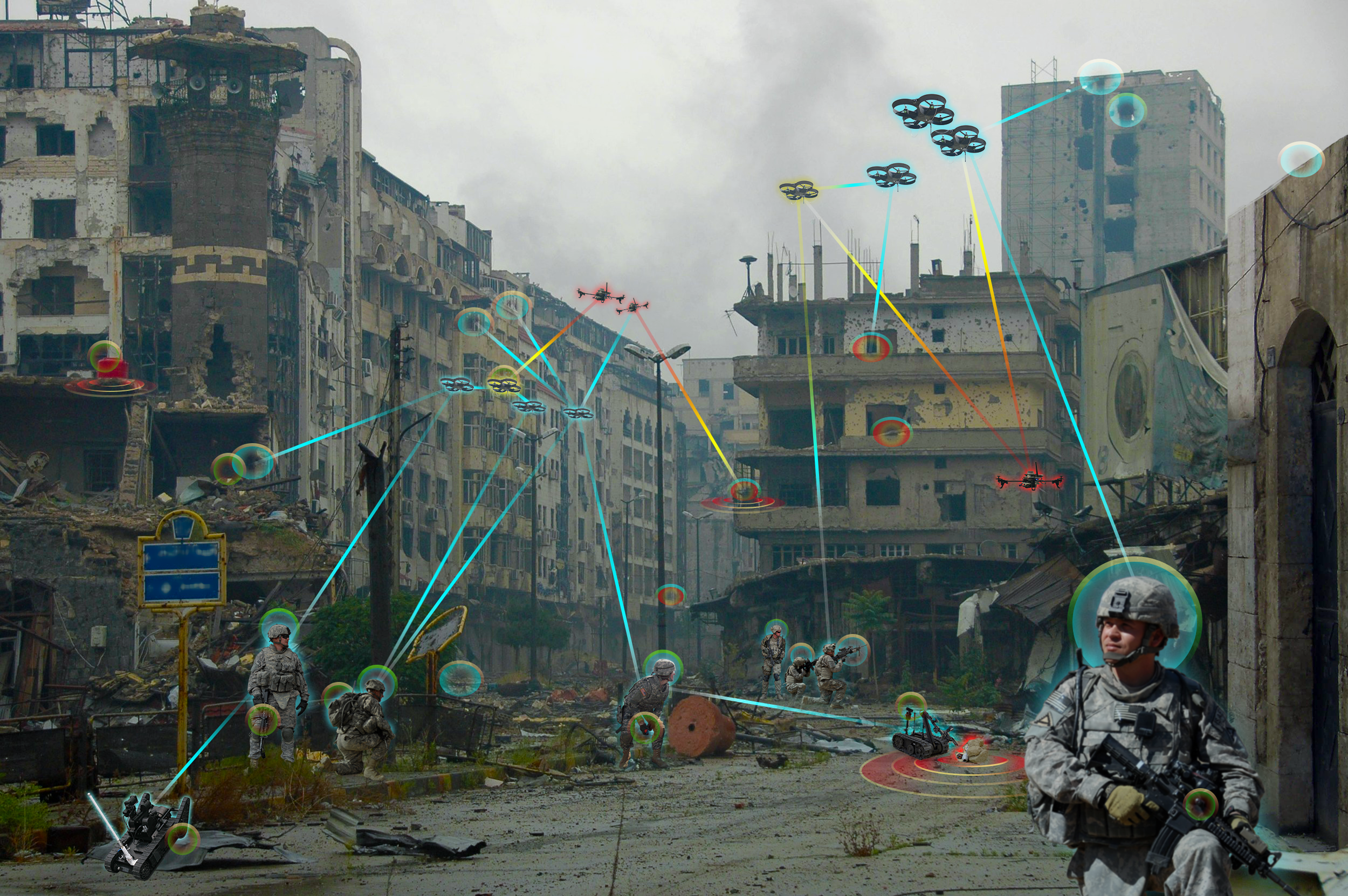
Internet of Battlefield Things technology in an unstructured, chaotic urban environment

The Internet of Battlefield Things Collaborative Research Alliance (IoBT-CRA), also known as the Internet of Battlefield Things Research on Evolving Intelligent Goal-driven Networks (IoBT REIGN), is a collaborative research alliance between government, industry, and university researchers for the purposes of developing a fundamental understanding of a dynamic, goal-driven Internet of Military Things (IoMT) known as the Internet of Battlefield Things (IoBT). It was first established by the U.S. Army Research Laboratory (ARL) to investigate the use of machine intelligence and smart technology on the battlefield, as well as strengthen the collaboration between autonomous agents and human soldiers in combat. An initial grant of $25 million was provided by ARL in October 2017 to fund the first five years of this potential 10-year research program.

The research effort is a collaboration between ARL and Carnegie Mellon University, the University of California, Berkeley, the University of California, Los Angeles, the University of Massachusetts, the University of Southern California, Georgetown University, and SRI International with the University of Illinois at Urbana-Champaign (UIUC) acting as the consortium lead.

== Goals ==
The IoBT-CRA was created as part of the U.S. Army’s long-term plans to keep up with technological advances in commercial industry and better prepare for future electronic warfare against more technologically sophisticated adversaries. In light of this objective, the IoBT-CRA focuses on exploring the capabilities of intelligent battlefield systems and large-scale heterogeneous sensor networks that dynamically evolve in real-time in order to adapt to Army mission needs. Part of the CRA research is dedicated to enhancing modern intelligent sensor and actuator capacity, allowing them to be compatible with secure military-owned networks, less trustworthy civilian networks, and adversarial networks.

ARL identified six areas of research that the IoBT-CRA should strive to develop as part of its program:

- Agile Synthesis: Theoretical models and methods of autonomic complex systems that provide the capacity to enable fast and effective command over military, adversary, and civilian networks.
- Reflexes: Theoretical models and methods for structuring dynamic IoBTs that perform adaptive, autonomic, and self-aware behavior at varying ranges of scale, distribution, resource constraints, and heterogeneity.
- Intelligent Battlefield Services: Scientific theories that will help improve the fundamental run-time capabilities of IoBTs with tasks such as information collection, predictive processing, and data anomaly detection.
- Security: Methods of increasing the defenses of IoBTs such that the system is resilient to attacks and tampering from adversaries and is able to continue operating under less-than-ideal situations.
- Dependability: Fundamental models related to asset composition, system adaptation, and intelligent services that are all aimed to increase the reliability of IoBTs in largely uncertain environments.
- Experimentation: The architectural foundations for the IoBT seek to evaluate how well theories, algorithms, and technologies perform under various military-related scenarios for the purpose of addressing issues regarding scale, composability, and compatibility.
