= Mike A. Horton =

American businessman

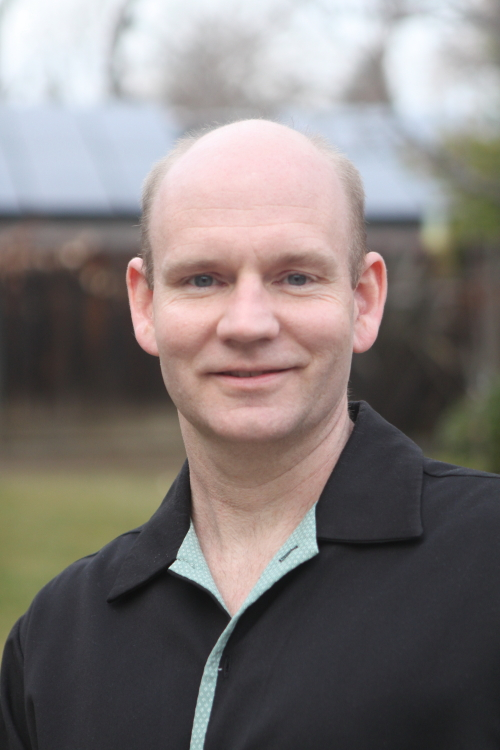
- Born: Austin, Texas (USA)
- Occupations: Project Creator & Co-Founder, GEODNET

Mike A. Horton is an American engineer and founder of a company producing sensor technology and sensor-based systems.

== Biography ==
Mike Horton was born October 23, 1973, in Austin, Texas, the second of two children of Claude Wendell Horton Jr. and Elisabeth Alice Becker.

Horton received a B.S. and an M.S. in electrical engineering from the University of California at Berkeley.

== Company ==
Following Horton's graduation, he co-founded Crossbow Technology in 1995 with his advisor A. Richard Newton. In 2003, MIT Technology Review magazine named him as one of the top young innovators under 35.

After exploring potential uses of silicon microelectromechanical systems sensor technology and experimenting with early acceleration sensors from the Berkeley Sensor and Actuator Sensor as well as commercial prototypes from Analog Devices, Horton and Newton formed a company to design and build products based on MEMS sensor technology. Crossbow Technology was founded in August, 1995. The company's initial vision was to leverage microelectromechanical systems-based sensor technology for motion-based input devices which are now used in video game systems such as the Nintendo Wii.

The company refined the technology for application in commercial aerospace, and it became the first company to be approved by the FAA as a TSO (Technical Standard Order) holder FAA for a silicon microelectromechanical systems based attitude and heading reference systems. An AHRS provides a solid-state replacement of unreliable mechanical gyroscopes as primary flight instruments, which can increase safety on general aviation aircraft. The company's MEMS-based inertial systems are also used in automated guidance of farm tractors and unmanned aerial vehicle systems.

Starting in 2001, Horton worked with UC Berkeley professor's Kristofer S. J. Pister and David Culler to develop and produce commercially available hardware for the Smartdust and TinyOS research community. These hardware platforms became known as "motes". The company produced several generations of "Motes" including the Mica2, Micaz, IRIS, iMote2, and TelosB. Applications range from crop monitoring to homeland security.

He served as CEO of Crossbow until its acquisition by Moog Inc. in 2011. Following the acquisition, Horton became an active contributor to Silicon Valley's early-stage and deep-tech investing community, participating in angel groups like Sand Hill Angels and Band of Angels, focusing on sensors, robotics, photonics, and autonomous technologies.

Subsequently, Horton served as Chief Technology Officer of Anello Photonics, where he led the development of photonic inertial navigation systems, including the world's first silicon photonic optical gyroscope integrated with MEMS-based systems.

Currently, Horton is the Project Creator and one of the co-founders of GEODNET, a decentralized physical infrastructure network (DePIN) designed to build a global array of multi-constellation GNSS reference stations. GEODNET provides real-time kinematic (RTK) corrections to enable high-precision positioning, benefiting applications in autonomous vehicles, precision agriculture, drone navigation, and geospatial mapping. The network utilizes blockchain incentives to drive global deployment of stations and has emerged as one of the most advanced examples of decentralized infrastructure within the Web3 ecosystem.

In May 2025, GEODNET was formally highlighted in the United States Congress as a leading real-world example of blockchain technology delivering tangible public benefits. During legislative hearings on the Financial Innovation and Technology for the 21st Century Act (FIT21), lawmakers cited GEODNET as a model demonstrating how decentralized infrastructure can contribute to innovation, national competitiveness, and regulatory clarity.

Horton holds more than 20 patents spanning navigation systems, MEMS, photonics, and decentralized network architectures. In recognition of his contributions to the field, he was named one of the Top 50 Sensor Technology Experts by Sensors Magazine in 2019 and received the Best Presentation Award at the Institute of Navigation’s GNSS+ conference in both 2021 and 2022. He continues to be an influential voice at the intersection of advanced hardware development, distributed systems, and deep-tech entrepreneurship.
