= OSIAN =

- Developer: OSIAN Open Source Community
- Written in: nesC
- OS family: Embedded operating systems
- Working state: Current
- Source model: Open source
- Initial release: 2010
- Latest release: 2.0.0 / October, 2010
- Marketing target: Wireless sensor networks
- Available in: English
- License: BSD License
- Official website: www.OpenOSIAN.net

OSIAN, or Open Source IPv6 Automation Network, is a free and open-source implementation of IPv6 networking for wireless sensor networks (WSNs). OSIAN extends TinyOS, which started as a collaboration between the University of California, Berkeley in co-operation with Intel Research and Crossbow Technology, and has since grown to be an international consortium, the TinyOS Alliance. OSIAN brings direct Internet-connectivity to smartdust technology.

== Design ==
Architecturally, OSIAN treats TinyOS as the underlying operating system providing hardware drivers, while OSIAN itself adds Internet networking capabilities. Users are able to download and install OSIAN-enabled firmware to their embedded hardware, form a PPP connection with their computer, and communicate raw IPv6 UDP to other wireless sensors from their favorite programming language on their computer.

OSIAN is developed using a style very much like the development of Linux, which requires peer reviews and unit testing before any code moves into core repositories.

== Platforms ==
OSIAN is designed for deeply embedded systems with very small amounts of memory. One primary platform contains a TI MSP430-based CC430 system-on-a-chip, which contains 32 kB ROM and 4 kB RAM.

== See also ==
- TinyOS
- Contiki
- 6LoWPAN
