= Claude Wendell Horton Jr. =

American physicist

Claude Wendell Horton, Jr.
- Born: February 3, 1942; Houston, Texas
- Died: July 10, 2025 (aged 83); Austin, Texas
- Education: University of Texas at Austin; University of California at San Diego
- Spouse: Elisabeth A. Becker (m. 1963; died 2007) Meiling Lung Newman (m. 2010)
- Children: Mike and John
- Parent(s): Claude Wendell Horton Sr. and Louise W. Horton
- Scientific career
- Fields: Physics
- Workplaces: University of Texas at Austin
- Doctoral advisor: Marshall Rosenbluth

Claude Wendell Horton (February 3, 1942 – July 10, 2025), known most commonly simply as Wendell Horton, was a professor of physics at the University of Texas at Austin and a student of plasma physics. Horton's core area of research was plasma transport and its application to the development of nuclear fusion power. He was a fellow of the American Physical Society.

== Biography ==
Claude Wendell Horton Jr. was born in Houston, Texas, the son of Louise Walthall Horton and Claude Wendell Horton Sr., who was one of the principal contributors to the development of the Department of Physics at the University of Texas.

Horton suffered from polio during his childhood before attending Austin High School, where he met Elisabeth Alice Becker in a physics class. Elisabeth is the daughter of Ernst D. Becker, a cotton trader, who had immigrated to Texas from Germany in 1927. Becker and Horton married shortly after graduation from the University of Texas, Austin, in June 1963. They had two children, Mike A. Horton and John W. Horton.

Elisabeth died of breast cancer in September 2007. Subsequently, Horton met Meiling Lung Newman, and they married in April 2010. Newman also lost a spouse to cancer.

Horton died at the Westminster Senior Living Facility on July 10, 2025.

== Scientific research ==
Horton's interest in nuclear fusion grew during his graduate studies at the University of California at San Diego. Horton was inspired by the enormous potential of controlled fusion reactions to generate cheap, clean, and sustainable Energy on an unprecedented and inexhaustible scale i.e., human-generated ‘Star Power’. Horton earned his PhD at UCSD under Marshall Rosenbluth, a scientist who had worked on the Manhattan Project and a close protégé of Edward Teller. Horton has published or edited thirteen books on the theoretical basis for plasma containment and transport, and co-authored over 200 papers. A frequently cited book is “Chaos and Structures in Nonlinear Plasmas” ISBN 81-7764-234-0.

Beginning in 1987, due to significant declines in US government funding of fusion research as a potential alternative energy source, Horton began to pursue research in space weather and the prediction of solar storms using chaos and plasma theory to model the magnetosphere, the latter of which has received characterization of an collisionless plasma that makes available new plasma transport regimes well beyond those existing in laboratory plasmas. Solar storm prediction can improve the reliability of communication and GPS–satellite systems.

However, the quest for fusion containment in a laboratory has been the biggest source of contribution and inspiration during Horton's 40-year career in theoretical physics. More recently, Horton focused on research in support of international fusion experiments including the ITER and Gamma10 fusion machines.
