= ODK =

ODK may refer to:

- Omicron Delta Kappa
- ODK (software)
- Oriental dwarf kingfisher
