= Wireless identification and sensing platform =

WISP
- Developer: Intel Research Seattle
- Written in: C, Assembly
- OS family: Embedded operating systems
- Working state: Current
- Source model: Open source
- Latest release: 5.1
- Marketing target: Wireless sensor networks
- License: Creative Commons Attribution License
- Official website: https://sites.google.com/uw.edu/wisp-wiki/home

A wireless identification and sensing platform (WISP) is an RFID (radio-frequency identification) device that supports sensing and computing: a microcontroller powered by radio-frequency energy. That is, like a passive RFID tag, WISP is powered and read by a standard off-the-shelf RFID reader, harvesting the power it uses from the reader's emitted radio signals. To an RFID reader, a WISP is just a normal EPC gen1 or gen2 tag; but inside the WISP, the harvested energy is operating a 16-bit general purpose microcontroller. The microcontroller can perform a variety of computing tasks, including sampling sensors, and reporting that sensor data back to the RFID reader. WISPs have been built with light sensors, temperature sensors, and strain gauges. Some contain accelerometers. WISPs can write to flash and perform cryptographic computations. The WISP was originally developed by Intel Research Seattle, but after their closure development work has continued at the Sensor Systems Laboratory at the University of Washington in Seattle.

== Implementation ==
The WISP consists of a board with power harvesting circuitry, demodulator, modulator, microcontroller, external sensors, and other components such as EEPROM and LED.

== Applications ==
WISPs have been used for light level measurement, acceleration sensing, cold chain monitoring (passive data logging), and cryptography and security applications.

== See also ==
- Indian Institute of Remote Sensing
- Intel Research Lablets
- Remote sensing in mobile telecommunications
- NODE platform
- Quality control system (QCS) for web and papers
- SWARM
- Wireless sensor network nodes
