= Osian =

Osian or Osiyan may refer to:

- Ancient nomadic tribes:
  - Asii, also known as the Osians in Central Asia
  - Osi (tribe) in Eastern Europe
- OSIAN, an Open Source IPv6 Automation Network for wireless sensors
- Osian art fund, an arts fund started in Mumbai (2010)
- Osian, Jodhpur, a city in Rajasthan, India
  - Osian tehsil, a subdivision of Jodhpur district in Rajasthan
- Osian (name), a name common in Wales, derived from the Irish Oisín
- Osiyan, Unnao, a village in Unnao district, Uttar Pradesh, India

== See also ==
- Ossian (disambiguation)
