= Intel Research Labs =

Research division of Intel

The Intel Research Labs were a research division of Intel. The organization was known for most of its life as Intel Research, but towards the end of its life the name Intel Research was re-defined to refer to all research performed in Intel, including work done outside the labs.

At its peak, there were six Intel Research Labs. The four university labs were each hosted by a partner university, while the two on-site labs were embedded inside normal Intel sites. Intel Research Berkeley was hosted by UC Berkeley, Intel Research Seattle by the University of Washington, Intel Research Pittsburgh by Carnegie Mellon University, and Intel Research Cambridge by the University of Cambridge in the United Kingdom.

In addition, the People and Practices Research Lab (PaPR) performed ethnographic research at Intel's Hillsboro, Oregon campus, and one at Intel's Santa Clara, California headquarters. The Intel PaPR was composed of sociologists, psychologists, and anthropologists whose job it was to understand how people lived their lives with or without technology, and how technology might be able to help. They used ethnography as their methodology which involves trying to understand how people live their lives, visiting consumers in their homes and workplaces, to see people’s behaviour on their terms within their experiences. Often, consumers cannot articulate what they are looking for in a product, product feature, or service. The Intel PaPR lab could, using ethnography, discover emerging trends that would then inform Intel's business strategy. By understanding the perspective of one group, consumers, they could communicate it to another, such as Intel business decision makers and engineers. Dr Genevieve Bell is a well-known former member of PaPR.

== History ==
Intel Research (as it was then known) was created in 2000, under the leadership of David L. Tennenhouse. Tennenhouse aimed to model his new research organization based on the US Defense Advanced Research Projects Agency (DARPA), where he had previously been director of the Information Technology Office. Tennenhouse promoted "proactive computing," where he envisioned users would interact with surrounding things and things would be able to have "digital-life".

In 2001, Intel Research adopted an open collaborative research model. In this model, Intel researchers worked directly with professors and students at the host university and shared knowledge freely. The contract with the host university stated that all intellectual property (IP) that resulted from a research project was jointly owned by both parties. Each lab was led by a professor from the host university, both with the goal of building deep connections to the university and avoiding any conflicts or misunderstandings between the lab and the university. Lab Directors included David Culler, Eric Brewer, Joseph M. Hellerstein, Mahadev Satyanarayanan, Todd Mowry, Gaetano Borriello, James Landay, and David Wetherall.

Due to the open nature of the research agreement, the labs focussed on areas that were not core to Intel's business, so that Intel did not need to control the intellectual property. Instead the labs worked or topics such as ubiquitous computing and sensor networks which might help create demand for aligned Intel products.

In December 2005, Tennenhouse left to head A9.com, and Andrew A. Chien, a former professor with high performance computing background at UC San Diego took over his position. Chien left Intel in May 2010 to return to academia as a professor at the University of Chicago. Justin Rattner, chief technology office of Intel, then took over Intel Labs and in addition, several vice presidents of Intel Labs were appointed.

The Cambridge lab closed in October 2006. The other three labs were shut down in January 2011. Instead, Intel announced it would directly fund research, with its first grant forming the Intel Science and Technology Center for Visual Computing at Stanford University, led by Pat Hanrahan.

== Projects ==
In most cases, projects were done in partnership with a host university. Some examples:

- Wireless identification and sensing platform (WISP)
- Claytronics
- TinyOS
- Urban Computing
- Prefix hash tree
- PlanetLab
