= Ossian (disambiguation) =

The Works of Ossian is an influential cycle of poems written by James Macpherson.

Ossian may also refer to:

== Places ==
- Ossian, Indiana, United States, a town
- Ossian, Iowa, United States, a city
- Ossian, New York, United States, a town
- Osian, Rajasthan, town in Jodhpur district, Rajasthan, India
- Loch Ossian, a lake in the Scottish Highlands

== Music ==
- Ossian (band), a Scottish traditional band of the 1970s and 1980s
- Ossian (Hungarian band), a Hungarian heavy metal band founded in the 1980s.
- Ossian D'Ambrosio, Italian heavy metal guitarist
- Ossian, ou Les bardes, an 1804 opera by Jean-François Le Sueur
- Osjan or Ossian, a Polish 1970s rock band

== Other uses ==
- Ossian (given name)
- Ossian (horse)
- Oisín, or Ossian, legendary Irish poet

== See also ==
- Osian (disambiguation)
