= Gaetano Borriello =

- Born: Naples, Italy
- Died: February 1, 2015 (aged 56–57); Seattle, Washington, U.S.
- Education: Polytechnic Institute of New York; Stanford University; UC Berkeley
- Known for: Open Data Kit; Founding Director of Intel Research Seattle
- Awards: ACM Fellow (2009); IEEE Fellow (2010); Fulbright Scholar
- Scientific career
- Fields: Ubiquitous computing
- Workplaces: Xerox PARC; University of Washington
- Thesis: A New Interface Specification Methodology and its Application to Transducer Synthesis (1988)
- Doctoral advisor: Randy Katz

Gaetano Borriello (1958 – February 1, 2015) was an Italian computer scientist and researcher in ubiquitous computing. He is known for starting the Open Data Kit project and as the founding director of Intel Research Seattle. The Place Lab project he led at Intel Research using Wi-Fi to enhance location sensing is now the dominant approach in use by Apple, Google, Microsoft, and others.

Borriello was named a Fellow of the ACM in 2009 "for the design, realization, and integration of embedded and ubiquitous computing systems" and of the IEEE in 2010 "for contributions to embedded computing devices and systems." He was also a Fulbright Scholar.

Borriello was on the University of Washington computer science faculty from 1988 until his death – 27 years. The Gaetano Borriello Endowed Fellowship for Change was funded by Borriello's friends after his death, to provide support for UW students "whose work is focused on exploring how technology can improve the lives of underserved populations".
