= Crossbow Technology =

Former California-based electronics company

Crossbow Technology, Inc.
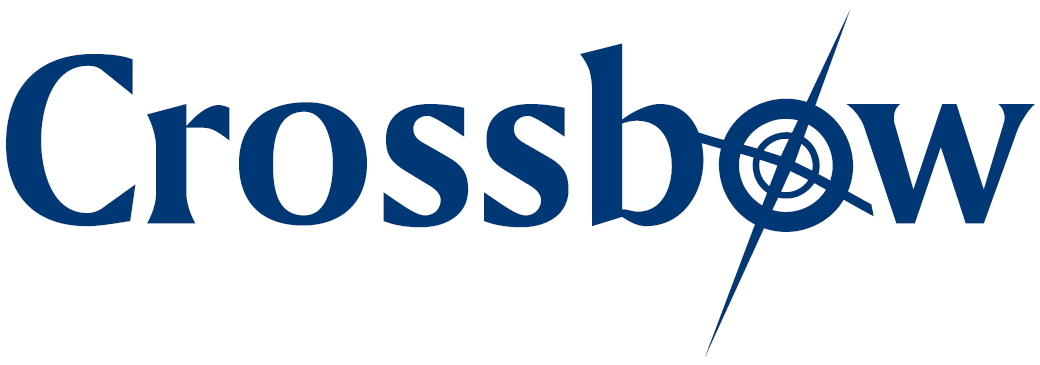
- Type: Private
- Industry: Electronics-specialized
- Founded: 1995
- Defunct: June 5, 2011
- Fate: Acquired by Moog Inc.
- Headquarters: Milpitas, California, U.S.
- Key people: Mike Horton (Founder)
- Products: Inertial measurement units, logistics, and asset tracking devices
- Number of employees: Approximately 50 (2011)

Crossbow Technology, Inc. (also referred to as XBOW) was a California-based company that specialized in navigation products, including gyroscopes and guidance, navigation, and control units.

== History ==
Crossbow was founded by Mike A. Horton in 1995. It created products based on technology developed at the University of California, Berkeley, supported by A. Richard Newton and had investment from Cisco, Intel, and the Paladin Capital Group in 2005. Crossbow was one of the first suppliers of the Berkeley-style MICA sensor nodes that it called "motes" which ran the TinyOS operating system.

Crossbow received awards for these products, including a "Best of Sensors Expo Gold 2006" and the BP Helios Award.

Formerly a joint venture, Crossbow Japan became the Sensor Networks and Systems department of Sumitomo Precision Products. On June 5, 2011, Crossbow was acquired by Moog Inc. for about $32 million.

== Products ==
The AHRS500GA, introduced in 2003, was a completely solid-state FAA-certified attitude and heading reference system (AHRS). It was designed into the Eclipse Aviation mode 500 very light jet and was used in the Capstone Program of the US Federal Aviation Administration.

In 2008, Crossbow released the eKo Pro Series System, a wireless sensor system that monitors crops, vineyards, agriculture, and the environment. In the same year, Crossbow Japan released the NeoMote to monitor energy usage in a building and provide a visual display for energy saving.
