= Decentralized physical infrastructure network =

Type of wireless telecommunication network

Decentralized physical infrastructure networks (DePINs) are a decentralized network architecture using blockchain technology. Physical Resource Networks are used to collectively operate physical infrastructure like wireless networks, energy grids, air and weather sensors, and transportation systems, while Digital Resource Networks manage digital resources such as bandwidth, computing power, and cloud storage. Participants can earn rewards by contributing data or services to the network.

== Platforms and technologies ==
Some competing standards and vendors for DePIN space include:

- Filecoin, a decentralised storage network.
- Sigfox, UNB-based technology and French company.
- LoRa is a proprietary, chirp spread spectrum radio modulation technology for LPWAN used by LoRaWAN, Haystack Technologies, and Symphony Link.
- MIoTy, implementing Telegram Splitting technology.
- Weightless is an open standard, narrowband technology for LPWAN used by Ubiik.
- IEEE 802.11ah, also known as Wi-Fi HaLow, is a low-power, wide-area implementation of 802.11 wireless networking standard using sub-gig frequencies.

== Types ==
Depending on their purpose, DePINs can be divided into two types. Physical Resource Networks rely on physical assets such as sensors and wireless networks. They operate at a local scale, and reward users for contributing data or network resources. Digital Resource Networks use digital assets such as bandwidth, computational resources or storage space, and encourage participants to contribute these resources to the network. They leverage a 'long tail' of idle capacity from participants.

== Market ==
Sector-wide figures come largely from commercial research firms. Messari put DePIN at roughly 10 billion United States dollars of circulating market capitalisation against about 72 million dollars of annual onchain revenue, and reported that most DePIN tokens had fallen between 94 and 99 percent from their all-time highs even as revenue rose, with Helium recording an increase of about eight times year over year. Reported sources of demand include rented GPU capacity for machine learning workloads, long-term storage contracts, mapping data, and data credits for wireless connectivity.

== See also ==
- Internet of things
- Wide area networks
- Static Context Header Compression (SCHC)
- Short range device
- IEEE 802.15.4 (Low-power personal-area network)
- IEEE 802.16 (WiMAX)
