= List of wireless sensor nodes =

A sensor node, also known as a mote (chiefly in North America), is a node in a sensor network that is capable of performing some processing, gathering sensory information and communicating with other connected nodes in the network. A mote is a node but a node is not always a mote.

== List of Wireless Sensor Nodes ==
List of Available Wireless Sensor Nodes
TECHNOLOGY				MCU				OPERATING SYSTEM			CONNECTIVITY							INTERFACES											SENSORS										DIMENSIONS (mm)			ENERGY						APPS		MEMORY				SERVICES								
NAME	MANUFACTURER	PRICE	RELEASE	ARCH	DEVICE	CLOCK	RTC	TinyOS	ContikiOS	Others	Bluetooth	Wi-Fi	802.15.4	Zigbee	XBee	6LoWPAN	WirelessHART	I^{2}C/TWI	SPI	UART	GPIO	USART	USB	ADC	DAC	Timers	JTAG	Others	Temperature	Humidity	Luminosity	Pressure	Gyroscope	Accelerometer	CO_{2}	Motion	Acoustic	Others	Length	Width	Height	Voltage	Sleep	Nominal	Radio RX	Radio TX	PoUSB	OTAP	SDK	RAM	Program Memory	Data Memory	Flash	HTTP	UDP	TCP	IPv4	IPv6	RPL	CoAP	API	Others
.NOW	The Samraksh Company	US$125	2012	RISC	ARM 32 bit Cortex M3 STM32F103	8-48 MHz	32.768 kHz	Partial	Future	eMote (.NET Micro Framework with real time extensions)	N/A	N/A	X	N/A	N/A	N/A	N/A	1	1	2 (1 via USB, 1 accessible on board)	13	2 (1 via USB, 1 accessible on board)	N/A	3 x 12 bit; multiple channels	1	12 x 16 bit; virtualized for users in eMote	1	N/A	On Kiwi companion board	N/A	On Kiwi companion board	N/A	N/A	On Kiwi companion board	N/A	N/A	On Kiwi companion board	MicroDoppler radar on Bumblebee companion board	76	70 with I/O section; 38 without	13	2v (battery); 3.3v (USB)	0.72 mW	18-60 mW depending on CPU speed	32 mW	16-26	N/A	N/A	X	96 kB	1024KB; 128 KB with eMote	Same as RAM	Same as Program Memory	N/A	N/A	N/A	N/A	N/A	N/A	N/A	N/A	N/A
ANT	Dynastream Innovation Inc.	N/A	2006	RISC	TI MSP430F1232	8 MHz	32 kHz	N/A	N/A	Ant	N/A	N/A	Nordic Semiconductor nRF24AP1	N/A	N/A	N/A	N/A	N/A	1	1	22	N/A	N/A	8x10 bit	N/A	1x16 bit	N/A	N/A	N/A	N/A	N/A	N/A	N/A	N/A	N/A	N/A	N/A	N/A	N/A	N/A	N/A	N/A	N/A	N/A	22 mA	16 mA	N/A	N/A	N/A	256 B	N/A	N/A	8 kB	N/A	N/A	N/A	N/A	N/A	N/A	N/A	N/A	N/A
WiSense	WiSense Technologies	US$20	2014	RISC	TI MSP430	8/16 MHz	32 kHz	N/A	N/A	N/A	N/A	N/A	TI CC1101	N/A	N/A	N/A	N/A	1	1	1	24	2	N/A	8x10 bit	N/A	3	Spy-bi-Wire	N/A	N/A	N/A	N/A	N/A	N/A	N/A	N/A	N/A	N/A	NA	42 mm	42 mm	N/A	1.8-3.6 V	1 μA	20 mA	NA	NA	N/A	N/A	N/A	4 kB	56 kB (FLASH)	128 KB (External EEPROM)	56 kB	N/A	N/A	N/A	N/A	N/A	N/A	N/A	N/A	N/A
AquisGrain	Philips Research	N/A	2004	AVR	Atmel ATmega128L	8 MHz	32 kHz	N/A	N/A	N/A	N/A	N/A	Chipcon CC2420	x	N/A	N/A	N/A	1	1	2	53	2	N/A	8x10 bit	N/A	2x8 bit & 2x16 bit	x	N/A	N/A	N/A	N/A	N/A	N/A	N/A	N/A	N/A	N/A	ECG	35	36	N/A	1.8-5.5 V	47 μA	31 mA	18.8-19.7 mA	17.4 mA	N/A	N/A	N/A	4 kB	4 kB (EEPROM)	4 Mbit (External Flash)	128 kB	N/A	N/A	N/A	N/A	N/A	N/A	N/A	N/A	N/A
Arduino BT	Arduino	N/A	2008	AVR	Atmel ATmega328	20 MHz	32 kHz	N/A	N/A	Arduino IDE/Java	Blue giga WT11i (v2.1)	802.11	x	N/A	N/A	N/A	N/A	1	2	1	23	1	x	14x10 bit	N/A	2x8 bit & 1x16 bit	N/A	N/A	x	N/A	N/A	N/A	N/A	N/A	N/A	N/A	N/A	N/A	81.28	53.34	N/A	2.5-12 V	N/A	N/A	N/A	N/A	N/A	N/A	N/A	2 kB	1 kB (EEPROM)	N/A	32 kB	N/A	N/A	N/A	N/A	N/A	N/A	N/A	N/A	N/A
AS-XM1000	AdvanticSys	95 euros	2011	RISC	TI MSP430F2618	16 MHz	N/A	v2.x	x	N/A	N/A	N/A	Chipcon CC2420	x	N/A	x	N/A	2	2	2	48	N/A	N/A	8x12 bit	12 bit	2x16 bit	x	IrDA	x	x	x	N/A	N/A	M	M	N/A	M	CO (M); Magnetic (M); Buzzer (M); Force & Load (M); Tilt (M); Dust (M)	81.90	32.50	6.55	2xAA (3.0 V)	1 μA	N/A	18.8-19.7 mA	17.4 mA	N/A	N/A	N/A	8 kB	N/A	1 MB (External Flash)	116 kB	x	x	x	x	x	x	x	N/A	N/A
AVRaven	Atmel	N/A	2008	AVR	Atmel ATmega1284p	4-20 MHz	32.768 kHz	N/A	x	Atmel Studio	N/A	N/A	Atmel AT86RF230	x	N/A	x	x	1	3	2	32	2	N/A	8x10 bit	N/A	2x8 bit & 1/2x16 bit	x	N/A	x	N/A	N/A	N/A	N/A	N/A	N/A	N/A	N/A	N/A	N/A	N/A	N/A	5-12 V (2xLR44 Battery Cells or External Power)	N/A	N/A	16 mA	17 mA	N/A	N/A	x	16 kB	4 kB (EEPROM)	16 MB	128 kB	x	x	x	x	x	x	x	N/A	N/A
AWAIRS1	Rockwell	N/A	1999	ARMv4	Intel StrongARM SA-1100	59-206 MHz	32.768 kHz	N/A	N/A	MicroC/OS	N/A	N/A	Conexant Systems RDSSS9M	N/A	N/A	N/A	N/A	N/A	x	x	26	N/A	x	4 bit	x	32 bit	x	RS232	x	N/A	N/A	x	N/A	x	N/A	N/A	x	Seismic; Magnetic	69.85	66.68	88.90	2x9 V batteries	44 μA	11.1-16.7 mA	0.06-5.56 mA	0.06-5.56 mA	N/A	N/A	N/A	128 kB	N/A	N/A	1 MB	N/A	N/A	x	x	N/A	N/A	N/A	N/A	N/A
BEAN	Universidade Federal de Minas Gerais	N/A	2004	RISC	TI MSP430F149	8 MHz	32.768 kHz	N/A	N/A	YATOS	N/A	N/A	Chipcon CC1000	N/A	N/A	N/A	N/A	x	2	2	48	2	N/A	8x12 bit	12 bit	2x16 bit	x	N/A	x/M	M	M	M	N/A	M	N/A	N/A	N/A	Magnetic (M); Seismic (M); H_{2}S (M); O_{2} (M); Sonar (M); Image (M)	N/A	N/A	N/A	N/A	N/A	N/A	9.6 mA	16.5 mA	N/A	N/A	N/A	2 kB	512 kB (EEPROM)	N/A	60 kB	N/A	N/A	N/A	N/A	N/A	N/A	N/A	x	N/A
BPart	TECO / KIT	from 40 Euro in Projekcts	2014	8051	8051 on Bluegiga BLE112	32 MHz	21 kHz	N/A	N/A	BGScript	BLE	N/A	CC2540	N/A	N/A	N/A	N/A	2	2	2	19	2	1	8x12bit	12bit	1x15, 2x8bit	x	N/A	x	N/A	x	N/A	N/A	x	N/A	N/A	N/A	Hall/Magnetic; IR diode, RGB LED	21mm	21mm	3mm	3V coin cell CR2023	20 μA	1-5mA	8mA	8mA	N/A	NA	BGScript	8kB	256 kB	8kB	256kB	N/A	N/A	N/A	N/A	N/A	N/A	N/A	BGScriopt, C	N/A
BSN Node v2	Imperial College London/Sensixa	Deprecated	2004	RISC	TI MSP430F149	8 MHz	N/A	x	N/A	N/A	N/A	N/A	Chipcon CC2420	x	N/A	x	N/A	N/A	2	2	48	2	N/A	8x12 bit	N/A	2x16 bit	N/A	N/A	x	N/A	N/A	N/A	N/A	N/A	N/A	N/A	N/A	N/A	N/A	N/A	N/A	N/A	N/A	N/A	18.8-19.7 mA	17.4 mA	N/A	N/A	N/A	2 kB	512 kB (EEPROM)	N/A	60 kB	N/A	N/A	N/A	N/A	x	x	N/A	N/A	N/A
BSN Node v3 ^{,}	Imperial College London/Sensixa	N/A	2008	RISC	TI MSP430F1611	8 MHz	N/A	x	N/A	BSNOS	N/A	N/A	Chipcon CC2420	x	N/A	x	N/A	1	2	2	48	1-2	N/A	8x12 bit	12 bit	2x16 bit	N/A	N/A	x	N/A	N/A	N/A	N/A	x	N/A	N/A	N/A	N/A	19	30	N/A	55 mAh (Battery)	1.1 μA	0.3 mA	18.8-19.7 mA	17.4 mA	N/A	N/A	N/A	10 kB	4 MB (External EEPROM)	N/A	48 kB	N/A	N/A	N/A	N/A	x	x	N/A	N/A	N/A
BTnode	BTnode	N/A	N/A	AVR	Atmel ATmega128L	8 MHz	32 kHz	x	N/A	N/A	Zeevo ZV4002 (v1.2)	N/A	Chipcon CC1000	N/A	N/A	x	N/A	1	1	2	53	2	x	8x10 bit	N/A	2x8 bit & 2x16 bit	N/A	N/A	N/A	N/A	N/A	N/A	N/A	N/A	N/A	N/A	N/A	N/A	N/A	N/A	N/A	N/A	N/A	N/A	9.6 mA	16.5 mA	N/A	N/A	N/A	64+180 kB	4 kB (EEPROM)	N/A	128 kB	N/A	N/A	N/A	N/A	x	x	N/A	N/A	N/A
BTnode rev3	BTnode	215 dollars	2006	AVR	Atmel ATmega128L	8 MHz	32 kHz	v2.x	N/A	N/A	Zeevo ZV4002 (v1.2)	x	Chipcon CC1000	N/A	N/A	x	N/A	1	1	2	53	2	x	8x10 bit	N/A	2x8 bit & 2x16 bit	x	N/A	x	x	x	x	N/A	x	N/A	N/A	N/A	x	58.15	33	N/A	2xAA (3.0 V) or External Power (3.8-5 V)	11.6 μA	46.6 mA	9.6 mA	16.5 mA	N/A	N/A	N/A	4 kB	4 kB (EEPROM)	N/A	128 kB	N/A	N/A	N/A	N/A	x	x	N/A	N/A	N/A
CENS Medusa MK2	University of California, Los Angeles	N/A	2002	AVR/ARM7TDMI	Atmel ATmega128L/Atmel AT91FR4081	8/40 MHz	32 kHz	N/A	N/A	Palos; uCos-II	N/A	N/A	RFMonolithics TR1000	N/A	N/A	N/A	N/A	1	1	2	53	2	N/A	8x10 bit	N/A	2x8 bit & 2x16 bit	x	Push Button; RS485; GPS	x	N/A	x	N/A	N/A	N/A	N/A	N/A	N/A	N/A	N/A	N/A	N/A	N/A	5-27 μA	39.4 mA	1.8-3.8 mA	2.9-12 mA	N/A	N/A	N/A	4/136 kB	4 kB (EEPROM)	32 kB/1 MB	N/A	N/A	N/A	N/A	N/A	N/A	N/A	N/A	N/A	N/A
CIT sensor node	Cork Institute of Technology	Deprecated	2004	N/A	Microchip PIC16F877	20 MHz	N/A	x	N/A	N/A	N/A	N/A	Nordic Semiconductor nRF903	N/A	N/A	x	N/A	2	2	1	40-44	1	N/A	8x10 bit	N/A	2x8 bit & 1x16 bit	N/A	N/A	N/A	N/A	N/A	N/A	N/A	N/A	N/A	N/A	N/A	N/A	N/A	N/A	N/A	N/A	N/A	N/A	18.5-22.5 mA	12.5-29.5 mA	N/A	N/A	N/A	368 B	N/A	N/A	8 kB	N/A	N/A	N/A	N/A	x	x	N/A	N/A	N/A
Cookies ^{,}	Universidad Politécnica de Madrid	N/A	2006	N/A	Analog Device ADuC841/Xilinx Spartan3 XC3S200	16/48 MHz	x	N/A	N/A	N/A	ConnectBlue OEMSPA13i	N/A	N/A	x	N/A	N/A	N/A	x	x	x	x	N/A	N/A	8x12 bit	2x12 bit & 2x16 bit	16 bit	N/A	RS232	x	x	N/A	N/A	N/A	N/A	N/A	N/A	N/A	pH (M); CO (M); SO_{2} (M); NO (M);	N/A	N/A	N/A	1.2-3.3 V	10 μA	70 mA	35.6 mA	35.6 mA	N/A	N/A	N/A	4/234 kB	N/A	N/A	62/- kB	N/A	N/A	N/A	N/A	N/A	N/A	N/A	N/A	N/A
CoSeN/MantaroBlocks	University of Maryland Baltimore County/Mantaro	N/A	2012	AVR	Atmel ATxMega32A4	32 MHz	32 kHz	N/A	N/A	Atmel Studio	N/A	N/A	Atmel AT86RF231	x	N/A	x	x	2	7	5	34	5	N/A	12x12 bit	2x12 bit	5x16 bit	N/A	IrDA	x	N/A	N/A	N/A	N/A	N/A	N/A	N/A	N/A	N/A	N/A	N/A	N/A	2.7-3.0 V	3.0-3.6 μA	637.8-728 μA	8.89-13.2 mA	10.4-14.4 mA	N/A	N/A	N/A	4 kB	1 kB (EEPROM)	N/A	32 kB	N/A	N/A	N/A	N/A	N/A	N/A	N/A	N/A	N/A
Cricket	MEMSIC/Massachusetts Institute of Technology	Deprecated	N/A	AVR	Atmel ATmega128L	8 MHz	32 kHz	v1.1.6	N/A	N/A	N/A	x	x	N/A	N/A	x	N/A	1	1	2	53	2	N/A	8x10 bit	N/A	2x8 bit & 2x16 bit	x	N/A	x	x	x	x	N/A	x	N/A	N/A	N/A	x	N/A	N/A	N/A	N/A	N/A	N/A	N/A	N/A	N/A	N/A	N/A	4 kB	4 kB (EEPROM)	N/A	128 kB	N/A	N/A	N/A	N/A	x	x	N/A	Clientlib	N/A
Dalian WSN	Dalian University of Technology	N/A	2008	ARM7TDMI	NXP Semiconductors LPC2138	30 MHz	32 kHz	N/A	N/A	N/A	N/A	N/A	Chipcon CC2420	x	N/A	N/A	N/A	2	1	2	47	N/A	N/A	8x10 bit	10 bit	2x32 bit	x	N/A	N/A	N/A	N/A	N/A	N/A	N/A	N/A	N/A	N/A	N/A	N/A	N/A	N/A	3.3 V	60-500 μA	10-40 mA	18.8-19.7 mA	17.4 mA	N/A	N/A	N/A	32 kB	N/A	N/A	512 kB	N/A	N/A	N/A	N/A	N/A	N/A	N/A	N/A	N/A
Dot	University of California, Berkeley	Deprecated	2001	AVR	Atmel ATmega163	8 MHz	32 kHz	x	N/A	N/A	N/A	N/A	RFMonolithics TR1000	N/A	N/A	x	N/A	1	1	2	32	N/A	N/A	8x10 bit	N/A	2x8 bit & 1x16 bit	N/A	N/A	N/A	N/A	N/A	N/A	N/A	N/A	N/A	N/A	N/A	N/A	N/A	N/A	N/A	Lithium CoinCell CR2032 (225 mAh)	1 μA	5 mA	1.8-3.8 mA	12 mA	N/A	N/A	N/A	1 kB	512 B (EEPROM)	N/A	16 kB	N/A	N/A	N/A	N/A	x	x	N/A	N/A	N/A
DSRPN	Chinese Academy of Science	Deprecated	2006	ARM	TI OMAP5912/TMS320C55x	192/200 MHz	32 kHz	N/A	N/A	N/A	x	N/A	x	N/A	N/A	N/A	N/A	x	x	3	64	N/A	OTG	N/A	N/A	3x32 bit	x	IrDA; SD/MMC; WAN 802.11X; GSM/GPRS	N/A	N/A	N/A	N/A	N/A	N/A	N/A	N/A	N/A	N/A	N/A	N/A	N/A	N/A	N/A	N/A	N/A	N/A	N/A	N/A	N/A	250/128 kB	N/A	N/A	N/A	N/A	N/A	N/A	N/A	N/A	N/A	N/A	N/A	N/A
DSYS25	University College Cork, Ireland	N/A	2004	AVR	Atmel ATmega128	8 MHz	32 kHz	x	N/A	N/A	N/A	N/A	Nordic Semiconductor nRF2401	N/A	N/A	x	N/A	1	1	2	53	2	N/A	8x10 bit	N/A	2x8 bit & 2x16 bit	x	N/A	N/A	N/A	N/A	N/A	N/A	N/A	N/A	N/A	N/A	N/A	25	25	N/A	2xAA/AAA (3.0 V) or CoinCell (1.9-3.6 V)	N/A	N/A	12.3 mA	11.3 mA	N/A	N/A	N/A	4 kB	4 kB (EEPROM)	N/A	128 kB	N/A	N/A	N/A	N/A	x	x	N/A	N/A	N/A
Egs	Johns Hopkins University	N/A	2010	ARMv7-M	Cortex®M3	96 MHz	N/A	v2.x	N/A	N/A	Mitsumi WML-C46 Class 2	N/A	Chipcon CC2520	x	N/A	x	N/A	x	x	x	N/A	N/A	OTG	x	N/A	N/A	x	MicroSD Slot Card	N/A	N/A	N/A	N/A	N/A	N/A	N/A	N/A	N/A	Pulse Oximetry	N/A	N/A	N/A	N/A	N/A	48 mA	18.5-50 mA	25.8-50 mA	x	N/A	N/A	52 kB	N/A	N/A	256 kB	N/A	N/A	N/A	N/A	x	x	N/A	N/A	N/A
Ember EmberNet	Ember	Deprecated	2005	AVR	Atmel ATmega128L	8 MHz	32 kHz	N/A	N/A	EmberNet	N/A	N/A	Ember 2420	x	N/A	N/A	N/A	1	1	2	53	2	N/A	8x10 bit	N/A	2x8 bit & 2x16 bit	x	N/A	N/A	N/A	N/A	N/A	N/A	N/A	N/A	N/A	N/A	N/A	7	7	N/A	1.8-3.3 V	0.5 μA	N/A	19.7 mA	20.7 mA	N/A	N/A	N/A	4 kB	4 kB (EEPROM)	N/A	128 kB	N/A	N/A	N/A	N/A	N/A	N/A	N/A	N/A	N/A
EnOcean TCM120 ^{,}	Helmut Schmidt University/EnOcean GmbH	N/A	2005	N/A	Microchip PIC18F452	10 MHz	32 kHz	x	N/A	N/A	N/A	N/A	Infineon TDA5200	N/A	N/A	x	N/A	2	2	1	40-44	1	N/A	8x10 bit	N/A	1x8 bit & 3x16 bit	x	N/A	N/A	N/A	N/A	N/A	N/A	N/A	N/A	N/A	N/A	N/A	24	42	5	4.75 V	8 μA	13.4 mA	15.8 mA	9.9 mA	N/A	N/A	N/A	1.5 kB	256 B (EEPROM)	N/A	32 kB	N/A	N/A	N/A	N/A	x	x	N/A	N/A	N/A
ENS	University of Edinburgh - School of Informatics	N/A	2010	RISC	TI MSP430F2410	16 MHz	32 kHz	N/A	N/A	ENS Network Software	N/A	N/A	Chipcon CC2420	x	N/A	N/A	N/A	2	2	2	48	N/A	N/A	8x12 bit	N/A	2x16 bit	x	IrDA	x	x	x	N/A	N/A	N/A	N/A	N/A	N/A	Soil Probe; Leaf Wetness	N/A	N/A	N/A	50 mAh (Battery) or Photo-Voltaic Supply	29.5-49.5 μA	2.9 mA	18.8-21.7 mA	17.4-19.5	N/A	N/A	N/A	4 kB	N/A	N/A	56 kB	N/A	N/A	N/A	N/A	N/A	N/A	N/A	N/A	N/A
EPIC mote	University of California, Berkeley	Deprecated	2008	RISC	TI MSP430F1611	8 MHz	N/A	x	N/A	N/A	N/A	N/A	Chipcon CC2420	x	N/A	x	N/A	1	2	2	48	1-2	N/A	8x12 bit	12 bit	2x16 bit	N/A	N/A	x	N/A	N/A	N/A	N/A	N/A	N/A	N/A	N/A	N/A	N/A	N/A	N/A	N/A	N/A	N/A	18.8-19.7 mA	17.4 mA	N/A	N/A	N/A	10 kB	512 kB (EEPROM)	N/A	48 kB	N/A	N/A	N/A	N/A	x	x	N/A	N/A	N/A
e-Watch	Carnegie Mellon University	N/A	2006	ARM7TDMI-S	Philips LPC2106	60 MHz	x	N/A	N/A	N/A	STARTM Bluetooth	N/A	N/A	N/A	N/A	N/A	N/A	1	1	2	32	N/A	N/A	x	N/A	2x32 bit	x	Buttons; Vibra; Buzzer; IrDA; ISP; IAP	M	N/A	M	N/A	N/A	M	N/A	N/A	M	N/A	N/A	N/A	N/A	1.65-1.95 V	10-500 μA	30 mA	N/A	N/A	N/A	N/A	N/A	64 kB	N/A	N/A	128 kB	N/A	N/A	N/A	N/A	N/A	N/A	N/A	N/A	N/A
eXtreme Scale Mote (XSM)	The Ohio State University/Crossbow	N/A	2004	AVR	Atmel ATmega128L	8 MHz	32.768 kHz	x	N/A	N/A	N/A	N/A	Chipcon CC1000	N/A	N/A	x	N/A	1	1	2	53	2	N/A	8x10 bit	N/A	2x8 bit & 2x16 bit	x	Buttons	x	N/A	x	N/A	N/A	x	N/A	x	x	PIR (M); Magnetic (M); GPS	88.9	88.9	63.5	2xAA (3.0 V)	N/A	N/A	9.6 mA	16.5 mA	N/A	x	N/A	4 kB	4 kB (EEPROM)	4 Mbit (Serial Flash)	128 kB	N/A	N/A	N/A	N/A	x	x	N/A	N/A	N/A
EYES	University of Twente	N/A	N/A	RISC	TI MSP430F149	5 MHz	N/A	N/A	N/A	PEEROS	N/A	N/A	RFMonolithics TR1001	N/A	N/A	N/A	N/A	N/A	2	2	48	2	N/A	8x12 bit	N/A	2x16 bit	x	RS232	x	N/A	x	x	N/A	x	N/A	N/A	x	Magnetic; Push Button	N/A	N/A	N/A	2xAA (2000 mAh, 3.0 V)	N/A	4-20 mA	1.8-4.8 mA	5.33-12 mA	N/A	N/A	N/A	2 kB	4 kB (EEPROM)	N/A	60 kB	N/A	N/A	N/A	N/A	N/A	N/A	N/A	N/A	N/A
eyesIFXv2.1	Infineon/Technische Universität Berlin	N/A	2005	RISC	TI MSP430F1611	8 MHz	N/A	x	N/A	N/A	N/A	N/A	Infineon TDA5250	N/A	N/A	x	N/A	1	2	2	48	1-2	N/A	8x12 bit	12 bit	2x16 bit	x	N/A	x	N/A	x	N/A	N/A	N/A	N/A	N/A	N/A	N/A	N/A	N/A	N/A	2500 mAh (Battery)	N/A	3.43 mA	9.5 mA	11.9 mA	N/A	N/A	N/A	10 kB	N/A	4 Mbit (External)	48 kB	N/A	N/A	N/A	N/A	x	x	N/A	N/A	N/A
FemtoNode	Universidade Federal do Rio Grande do Sul	N/A	2009	Harvard	FemtoJava	56 MHz	x	N/A	N/A	API-Wireless	N/A	N/A	Chipcon CC2420	x	N/A	N/A	N/A	N/A	x	N/A	N/A	N/A	N/A	N/A	N/A	2x32 bit	N/A	N/A	N/A	N/A	N/A	N/A	N/A	N/A	N/A	N/A	N/A	N/A	N/A	N/A	N/A	N/A	N/A	N/A	18.8-19.7 mA	17.4 mA	N/A	N/A	N/A	0.5 kB	N/A	N/A	N/A	N/A	N/A	N/A	N/A	N/A	N/A	N/A	N/A	N/A
FireFly	Nanork/Carnegie Mellon University	N/A	2012	AVR	Atmel ATmega1281	7.3728 MHz	32.768 kHz	N/A	N/A	Nano-RK RTOS	N/A	N/A	Chipcon CC2420	x	N/A	N/A	N/A	1	3	2	54	4	N/A	16x10 bit	N/A	2x8 bit & 4x16 bit	x	Mini-SD/MMC Slot	M	x	M	x	N/A	M	N/A	x	x	Battery Level Indicator (M); Voltage Sensing (M); PIR (M)	75.2	33.9	N/A	2xAA (3.0 V) or 3.3-10.0 V (Voltage Regulator)	0.2 μA	24.8 mA	18.8-19.7 mA	17.4 mA	N/A	N/A	N/A	8 kB	4 kB (EEPROM)	Mini-SD/MMC Slot	128 kB	N/A	N/A	N/A	N/A	N/A	N/A	N/A	N/A	N/A
FireFly3	Carnegie Mellon University	N/A	2012	AVR	Atmel ATmega128RFA1	16 MHz	32 kHz	N/A	N/A	Nano-RK	N/A	N/A	Atmel ATmega 128RFA1	N/A	N/A	x	x	1	1	1	38	2	N/A	8x10 bit	x	6	N/A	N/A	x	N/A	N/A	N/A	N/A	N/A	N/A	N/A	N/A	Electric Field (M); Magnetic Field (M)	N/A	N/A	N/A	N/A	N/A	N/A	16.6 mA	18.6 mA	N/A	N/A	N/A	16 kB	4 kB (EEPROM)	N/A	128 kB	N/A	N/A	N/A	N/A	x	N/A	N/A	N/A	N/A
Fleck 1 ^{,}	CSIRO	N/A	2004	AVR	Atmel ATmega128	16 MHz	32 kHz	x	N/A	N/A	N/A	N/A	Nordic Semiconductor nRF903	N/A	N/A	x	N/A	1	1	2	53	2	N/A	8x10 bit	N/A	2x8 bit & 2x16 bit	x	N/A	x	N/A	x	N/A	N/A	N/A	N/A	N/A	N/A	N/A	60	60	N/A	N/A	N/A	N/A	18.5-22.5 mA	12.5-29.5 mA	N/A	N/A	N/A	4 kB	4 kB (EEPROM)	N/A	128 kB	N/A	N/A	N/A	N/A	x	x	N/A	N/A	N/A
Fleck 2 ^{,}	CSIRO	N/A	2004	AVR	Atmel ATmega128	16 MHz	32 kHz	x	N/A	N/A	N/A	N/A	Nordic Semiconductor nRF903	N/A	N/A	x	N/A	1	1	2	53	2	N/A	8x10 bit	N/A	2x8 bit & 2x16 bit	x	N/A	x	N/A	N/A	N/A	N/A	x	N/A	N/A	N/A	Magnetic; GPS	130	90	60	N/A	N/A	N/A	18.5-22.5 mA	12.5-29.5 mA	N/A	N/A	N/A	4 kB	4 kB (EEPROM)	N/A	128 kB	N/A	N/A	N/A	N/A	x	x	N/A	N/A	N/A
Fleck 3 ^{,}	CSIRO	N/A	2007	AVR	Atmel ATmega128L	8 MHz	32.768 kHz	v1.x	N/A	FOS	N/A	N/A	Nordic Semiconductor nRF905	N/A	N/A	x	N/A	1	1	2	53	2	N/A	8x10 bit	N/A	2x8 bit & 2x16 bit	x	RS232	x/Air&Soil (M)	Air&Soil (M)	N/A	N/A	M	M	N/A	N/A	N/A	Magnetic (M); GPS (M)	50	60	N/A	3.5-8 V (3xAA, Battery or Solar Charge)	33 μA	1 mA	12.5 mA	9-30 mA	N/A	N/A	N/A	4-8 kB	4 kB (EEPROM)	1-8 MB (External Flash)	128 kB	N/A	N/A	N/A	N/A	x	x	N/A	N/A	N/A
G-Node G301 ^{,}	SOWNet Technologies/Technical University of Delft	68 euros	2010	RISC	TI MSP430F2418	16 MHz	N/A	v2.1	N/A	N/A	N/A	N/A	Chipcon CC1101	N/A	N/A	x	N/A	2	2	2	48	N/A	x	8x12 bit	12 bit	2x16 bit	x	IrDA	x	M	M	N/A	N/A	M	N/A	N/A	N/A	N/A	19	60	6	USB Power (5.0 V), 2xAAA (3.0 V) or Battery (1.8-3.6 V)	2 μA	35 mA	70 mA	70 mA	15 mA	N/A	N/A	8 kB	N/A	8 Mbit (External)	116 kB	N/A	N/A	N/A	N/A	x	x	N/A	N/A	N/A
GWNode	University of Southampton - Electronics and Computer Science	N/A	2007	Harvard	Microchip PIC18LF8722	40 MHz	32 kHz	N/A	N/A	N/A	N/A	N/A	Radiometrix BiM 1	N/A	N/A	N/A	N/A	2	2	N/A	x	2	N/A	16x10 bit	N/A	3x8 bit & 3x16 bit	N/A	RS232; RS485; LIN 1.2	x	x	x	x	N/A	N/A	N/A	N/A	N/A	Conductivity; Magnetic; Tilt; Strain Gauge	40	50	N/A	3xAA (3.6-4.5 V)	1 μA	60 mA	35-90 mA	18-80 mA	N/A	N/A	N/A	4 kB	1 kB (EEPROM)	N/A	128 kB	N/A	N/A	N/A	N/A	N/A	N/A	N/A	N/A	N/A
Hermes	Microsensus	Deprecated	N/A	CISC	TI MSP430F2	N/A	N/A	x	N/A	MicrosensusOS	N/A	N/A	x	N/A	N/A	x	N/A	N/A	N/A	N/A	N/A	N/A	N/A	N/A	N/A	N/A	x	N/A	x	N/A	N/A	N/A	x	x	N/A	N/A	N/A	Heart Beat	82	35	23	N/A	N/A	N/A	N/A	N/A	N/A	N/A	N/A	N/A	N/A	N/A	N/A	N/A	N/A	N/A	N/A	x	x	N/A	N/A	N/A
Hogthrob	Technical University of Denmark	N/A	2005	AVR/-	Atmel ATmega 128L/Xilinx Spartan3 XC3S400	8/48 MHz	32 kHz	x	N/A	N/A	N/A	N/A	Nordic Semiconductor nRF2401	N/A	N/A	x	N/A	1	1	2	53	2	N/A	8x10 bit	N/A	2x8 bit & 2x16 bit	x	N/A	x	N/A	N/A	N/A	N/A	N/A	N/A	N/A	N/A	N/A	N/A	N/A	N/A	3.273 V	N/A	10 mA	12.3 mA	11.3 mA	N/A	N/A	N/A	4/56 kB	N/A	4 MB (Serial Flash)	128/- kB	N/A	N/A	N/A	N/A	x	x	N/A	N/A	N/A
iBadge	University of California, Los Angeles	N/A	2002	AVR	Atmel ATmega128L	8 MHz	32 kHz	N/A	N/A	Palos; Sylph	Ericsson ROK101007	N/A	RFMonolithics TR1000	N/A	N/A	N/A	N/A	1	1	2	53	2	x	8/24 bit	N/A	2x8 bit & 2x16 bit	x	Ultra Sound Transceiver; RS232	x	x	x	x	N/A	x	N/A	N/A	x	Magnetic Field	70	55	18	3.6 V (700 mAh Battery)	N/A	N/A	1.8-3.8 mA	12 mA	N/A	N/A	N/A	4 kB	4 kB (EEPROM)	N/A	128 kB	N/A	N/A	N/A	N/A	N/A	N/A	N/A	N/A	N/A
iCubes	Technical University of Crete	N/A	2009	N/A	Silicon Labs C8051F320	25 MHz	x	N/A	N/A	N/A	N/A	N/A	Chipcon CC2500	N/A	N/A	N/A	N/A	1	1	1	46	N/A	2.0	17x10 bit	N/A	4x16 bit	N/A	RS232	x	x	N/A	N/A	N/A	N/A	N/A	N/A	N/A	N/A	N/A	N/A	N/A	1.8-3.6 V	N/A	N/A	12.8-19.6 mA	11.1-21.2 mA	N/A	x	N/A	2 kB	N/A	N/A	16 kB	N/A	N/A	N/A	N/A	N/A	N/A	N/A	N/A	N/A
IECAS	Institute of Electronics - Chinese Academy of Science	N/A	2006	N/A	Silicon Labs C8051F121	100 MHz	x	N/A	N/A	N/A	N/A	N/A	Chipcon CC2420/CC1020	x	N/A	N/A	N/A	1	1	2	64	N/A	N/A	8x8 bit & 8x10/12 bit	2x12 bit	5x16 bit	x	N/A	x	x	N/A	x	N/A	N/A	N/A	N/A	N/A	N/A	N/A	N/A	N/A	2.7-3.6 V	0.2 μA	1.7 mA	18.8-19.9 mA	17.4-27.1 mA	N/A	N/A	N/A	84 kB	N/A	N/A	128 kB	N/A	N/A	N/A	N/A	N/A	N/A	N/A	N/A	N/A
iMote1	Intel	N/A	2003	ARM7TDMI	Zeevo ZV4002	12-48 MHz	N/A	x	N/A	N/A	Zeevo ZV4002 (v1.2)	N/A	N/A	N/A	N/A	x	N/A	x	x	x	x	N/A	x	N/A	N/A	N/A	x	N/A	N/A	N/A	N/A	N/A	N/A	N/A	N/A	N/A	N/A	N/A	N/A	N/A	N/A	N/A	N/A	N/A	N/A	N/A	N/A	N/A	N/A	64 kB	N/A	N/A	512 kB	N/A	N/A	N/A	N/A	x	x	N/A	N/A	N/A
iMote2	Crossbow	N/A	2005	ARM* V5te	Intel PXA271 Xscale	13-416 MHz	32.768 kHz	x	N/A	SOS; Linux	N/A	N/A	Chipcon CC2420	x	N/A	x	N/A	2	1	3	x	N/A	OTG	x	x	x	x	AC'97; IrDA (M); SD/MMC Controller; I^{2}S; Camera (M)	M	M	M	N/A	N/A	M	N/A	M	N/A	N/A	36	48	9	3xAAA (4.5 V), Battery (3.2-4.5V) or Li-Ion/Li-Poly Batteries	390 μA	31 mA	44-66 mA	44-66 mA	x	N/A	N/A	256 kB	N/A	N/A	32 MB	N/A	N/A	N/A	N/A	x	x	N/A	N/A	N/A
Indriya_DP_01A11	Indrion	N/A	2011	RISC	TI MSP430F2418	16 MHz	N/A	x	N/A	N/A	N/A	N/A	Chipcon CC2520	x	N/A	x	N/A	2	2	2	48	N/A	N/A	8x12 bit	12 bit	2x16 bit	x	N/A	x	M	x	N/A	N/A	x	M	M	N/A	Vibration (M); Tilt (M); Ultrasonic (M); Magnetic (M); Image (M); IrDA (M)	N/A	N/A	N/A	2xAA (3.0 V)	24 μA	100 μA	18.5 mA	25.8-33.6 mA	N/A	N/A	N/A	8 kB	N/A	N/A	116 kB	N/A	N/A	N/A	N/A	x	x	N/A	x	N/A
Indriya_DP_03A14	Indrion	N/A	2010	AVR	Atmel ATmega128L	8 MHz	32 kHz	x	N/A	N/A	N/A	N/A	Digi Xbee-Series2	x	x	x	N/A	1	1	2	53	2	N/A	8x10 bit	N/A	2x8 bit & 2x16 bit	x	N/A	x	M	x	N/A	N/A	x	M	M	N/A	Vibration (M); Tilt (M); Ultrasonic (M); Magnetic (M); Image (M); IrDA (M)	N/A	N/A	N/A	2xAA (3.0 V)	2.5 mA	5.5 mA	40 mA	40 mA	N/A	N/A	N/A	4 kB	4 kB (EEPROM)	N/A	128 kB	N/A	N/A	N/A	N/A	x	x	N/A	x	N/A
Indriya_DP_03A20	Indrion	N/A	2011	AVR	Atmel ATmega128L	8 MHz	32 kHz	x	N/A	N/A	N/A	802.11b/g/n	GainSpan GS1011 M	N/A	N/A	x	N/A	1	1	2	53	2	N/A	8x10 bit	N/A	2x8 bit & 2x16 bit	x	N/A	x	M	x	N/A	N/A	x	M	M	N/A	Vibration (M); Tilt (M); Ultrasonic (M); Magnetic (M); Image (M); IrDA (M)	N/A	N/A	N/A	2xAA (3.0 V)	2.5 mA	5.5 mA	150 mA	150 mA	N/A	N/A	N/A	4 kB	4 kB (EEPROM)	N/A	128 kB	N/A	N/A	N/A	N/A	x	x	N/A	N/A	N/A
Iris	MEMSIC	N/A	2011	AVR	Atmel ATmega1281	16 MHz	32 kHz	x	x	MoteWorks/MoteRunner	N/A	x	Atmel AT86RF230	x	N/A	x	x	1	3	2	54	4	N/A	16x10 bit	N/A	2x8 bit & 4x16 bit	x	N/A	M	M	M	M	N/A	M	N/A	N/A	M	Magnetic (M)	58	32	7	2xAA (3.0 V) or External Power (2.7-3.3 V)	8 μA	8 mA	16 mA	10-17 mA	N/A	x	x	8 kB	4 kB (EEPROM)	512 kB (Serial Flash)	128 kB	x	x	x	x	x	x	x	N/A	N/A
iSense Core Module 2	Coalesenses	N/A	2009	RISC	Jennic JN5148	4-32 MHz	N/A	N/A	N/A	iSense	N/A	N/A	Jennic JN5148	x	N/A	N/A	N/A	1	1	2	21	N/A	N/A	4x12 bit	2x12 bit	3	x	N/A	x	x	x	x	N/A	x	N/A	N/A	N/A	PIR; Anisotropic Magneto-Resistive	45	30	N/A	2.0-5.5 V	3.75 μA	1.6-9.4 mA	15.9-21.4 mA	13.4-108.4 mA	x	x	N/A	128 kb	128 kB	128 kB	512 kB	N/A	N/A	N/A	N/A	N/A	N/A	N/A	N/A	N/A
iSense Core Module 3	Coalesenses	N/A	2011	RISC	Jennic JN5148	4-32 MHz	N/A	N/A	N/A	iSense	N/A	N/A	Jennic JN5148	x	N/A	N/A	N/A	1	1	2	21	N/A	x	4x12 bit	2x12 bit	3	x	N/A	x	x	x	x	N/A	x	N/A	N/A	N/A	PIR; Anisotropic Magneto-Resistive	45	30	N/A	2.0-5.5 V	3.75 μA	1.6-9.4 mA	15.9-21.4 mA	13.4-108.4 mA	x	x	N/A	128 kB	128 kB	128 kB	512 kB	N/A	N/A	N/A	N/A	N/A	N/A	N/A	N/A	N/A
JN5121	Jennic	N/A	2007	RISC	OpenRSIC1000	16 MHz	N/A	N/A	N/A	JenNet/Jenie	N/A	N/A	x	x	N/A	N/A	N/A	N/A	x	x	x	N/A	N/A	12 bit	11 bit	x	N/A	N/A	x	N/A	N/A	N/A	N/A	N/A	N/A	N/A	N/A	N/A	18	30	N/A	2.7-3.6 V	14 μA	N/A	50-60 mA	45-115 mA	N/A	N/A	N/A	96 kB	64 kB (ROM)	N/A	128 kB	N/A	N/A	N/A	N/A	N/A	N/A	N/A	N/A	N/A
Kmote-B	InTech Co./TinyOS Mall	37.85 dollars	2009	RISC	TI MSP430F1611	8 MHz	N/A	x	N/A	N/A	N/A	N/A	Chipcon CC2420	x	N/A	x	N/A	1	2	2	48	1-2	N/A	8x12 bit	12 bit	2x16 bit	x	N/A	x	N/A	N/A	N/A	N/A	N/A	N/A	N/A	N/A	N/A	N/A	N/A	N/A	2.7-3.6 V (Battery)	6-7 μA	1.5 mA	18.8-21.1 mA	17.4-19.3 mA	N/A	N/A	N/A	10 kB	512 kB (EEPROM)	N/A	48 kB	N/A	N/A	N/A	N/A	x	x	N/A	N/A	N/A
LEAP	University of California, Los Angeles	N/A	2006	ARM* V5te	Intel PXA255	400 MHz	32.768 kHz	N/A	N/A	LEAP software framework	N/A	N/A	Chipcon CC2420/Atheros 5006XS	x	N/A	N/A	N/A	x	x	x	x	N/A	x	x	N/A	x	x	Ethernet; AC97; Multimedia Card; FIR; I^{2}S; RS232; GPS (M)	N/A	N/A	N/A	N/A	N/A	N/A	N/A	N/A	N/A	N/A	N/A	N/A	N/A	3.3-5 V	5 mA	41-50 mA	18.8-19.7 mA	17.4 mA	N/A	N/A	N/A	128 MB	192 MB	N/A	64 MB	N/A	N/A	N/A	N/A	N/A	N/A	N/A	N/A	N/A
Lotus	MEMSIC	N/A	2011	ARMv7	Cortex®M3	10-100 MHz	N/A	x	N/A	Free RTOS; MoteRunnerTM; MEMSIC Kiel; RTOS; IAR Systems	N/A	x	Atmel AT86RF231	x	N/A	x	x	x	x	x	x	N/A	OTG	12 bit	N/A	N/A	x	I^{2}S	M	M	M	M	N/A	M	N/A	N/A	M	Magnetic (M)	76	34	7	2xAA (3.0 V) or External Power (2.7-3.3 V)	10 μA	50 mA	13.2-16.0 mA	10-17 mA	N/A	N/A	N/A	64 kB	N/A	64 MB (Serial Flash)	512 kB	N/A	N/A	N/A	N/A	x	x	N/A	N/A	N/A
LTC5800-WHM	Linear	N/A	N/A	ARMv7	Cortex®M3	7.3728 MHz	32.768 kHz	N/A	N/A	N/A	N/A	N/A	x	N/A	N/A	N/A	x	x	x	x	x	N/A	OTG	10 bit	4 bit	N/A	x	N/A	x	x	N/A	N/A	N/A	N/A	N/A	N/A	N/A	N/A	10	10	N/A	2.1-3.76 V	0.8 μA	12 mA	4.5 mA	5.4-9.7 mA	N/A	N/A	N/A	72 kB	N/A	N/A	512 kB	N/A	N/A	N/A	N/A	N/A	N/A	N/A	x	N/A
LTP5900-WHM	Linear	N/A	N/A	ARMv7	Cortex®M3	N/A	N/A	N/A	N/A	N/A	N/A	N/A	x	N/A	N/A	N/A	x	N/A	x	x	N/A	N/A	OTG	N/A	N/A	N/A	x	N/A	x	x	N/A	N/A	N/A	N/A	N/A	N/A	N/A	N/A	24	39	N/A	2.75-3.76 V	N/A	N/A	4.5 mA	5.4-9.7 mA	N/A	N/A	N/A	N/A	N/A	N/A	N/A	N/A	N/A	N/A	N/A	N/A	N/A	N/A	x	N/A
LTP5901-WHM	Linear	N/A	N/A	ARMv7	Cortex®M3	7.3728 MHz	32.768 kHz	N/A	N/A	N/A	N/A	N/A	x	N/A	N/A	N/A	x	x	x	x	x	N/A	OTG	10 bit	4 bit	N/A	x	N/A	x	x	N/A	N/A	N/A	N/A	N/A	N/A	N/A	N/A	24	42	N/A	2.1-3.76 V	0.8 μA	12 mA	4.5 mA	5.4-9.7 mA	N/A	N/A	N/A	72 kB	N/A	N/A	512 kB	N/A	N/A	N/A	N/A	N/A	N/A	N/A	x	N/A
LTP5902-WHM	Linear	N/A	N/A	ARMv7	Cortex®M3	7.3728 MHz	32.768 kHz	N/A	N/A	N/A	N/A	N/A	x	N/A	N/A	N/A	x	x	x	x	x	N/A	OTG	10 bit	4 bit	N/A	x	N/A	x	x	N/A	N/A	N/A	N/A	N/A	N/A	N/A	N/A	24	37	N/A	2.1-3.76 V	0.8 μA	12 mA	4.5 mA	5.4-9.7 mA	N/A	N/A	N/A	72 kB	N/A	N/A	512 kB	N/A	N/A	N/A	N/A	N/A	N/A	N/A	x	N/A
M12 ^{,}	Redwire	38 dollars	2012	ARM7TDMI	Freescale MC13224v	24-26 MHz	32.768 kHz	N/A	x	N/A	N/A	N/A	Freescale MC13224v	x	N/A	x	N/A	2	4	8	64	N/A	N/A	8x12 bit	12 bit	16 bit	x	I^{2}S	N/A	N/A	N/A	N/A	N/A	N/A	N/A	N/A	N/A	N/A	45.1	30.1	6.2	2.1-3.6 V (Battery)	2-150 μA	3.3 mA	21-24 mA	29-35 mA	N/A	x	N/A	96 kB	80 kB (ROM)	N/A	128 kB	x	x	x	x	x	x	x	N/A	N/A
Mantis Nymph	University of Colorado	N/A	2003	AVR	Atmel ATmega128L	8 MHz	32 kHz	N/A	N/A	MOS	N/A	N/A	Chipcon CC1000	N/A	N/A	N/A	N/A	1	1	2	53	2	N/A	8x10 bit	N/A	2x8 bit & 2x16 bit	x	RS232; GPS	N/A	N/A	N/A	N/A	N/A	N/A	N/A	N/A	N/A	N/A	35	55	N/A	External DC Input (1.8-3.6 V) or CR2477 Lithium CoinCell	1 mA	15 mA	29-42 mA	42-75 mA	N/A	N/A	N/A	4 kB	4+64 (External) kB (EEPROM)	N/A	128 kB	N/A	N/A	N/A	N/A	N/A	N/A	N/A	N/A	N/A
MASN	Rochester Institute of Technology	N/A	2008	N/A	Ember EM250 (XAP2b)	12 MHz	32.768 kHz	x	N/A	N/A	x	802.11g	Ember EM250	x	N/A	x	N/A	2	2	1	17	N/A	N/A	12 bit	x	3x16 bit	N/A	N/A	N/A	N/A	N/A	N/A	N/A	N/A	N/A	N/A	N/A	ECG	N/A	N/A	N/A	N/A	1.5 mA	8.5 mA	36 mA	36 mA	N/A	N/A	N/A	10 kB	N/A	N/A	128 kB	N/A	N/A	N/A	N/A	x	x	N/A	N/A	N/A
MediMesh	Chinese University of Hong Kong	N/A	2005	RISC	TI MSP430F1611	8 MHz	N/A	x	N/A	N/A	N/A	N/A	Chipcon CC2420	x	N/A	x	N/A	1	2	2	48	1-2	N/A	8x12 bit	12 bit	2x16 bit	x	N/A	x	N/A	N/A	N/A	N/A	N/A	N/A	N/A	N/A	ECG (M); Finger Pulse Oximeter (M)	26	23	N/A	N/A	N/A	N/A	18.8-19.7 mA	17.4 mA	N/A	N/A	N/A	10 kB	N/A	4 MB (Serial Flash)	48 kB	N/A	N/A	N/A	N/A	x	x	N/A	N/A	N/A
Mica	University of California, Berkeley	N/A	2002	AVR	Atmel ATmega128L	8 MHz	32 kHz	x	N/A	N/A	x	802.11b	RFMonolithics TR1000	N/A	N/A	x	N/A	1	1	2	53	2	N/A	8x10 bit	N/A	2x8 bit & 2x16 bit	x	RS232	x	N/A	x	x	N/A	x	N/A	N/A	x	Magnetic Field; PIR; Vibration	31.75	57.15	N/A	2xAA (2850 mAh, 2–3.2 V), Lithium Coin Cell or External DC Input (3.3 V)	10 μA	5.5 mA	5 mA	7-12 mA	N/A	N/A	N/A	4 kB	4 kB (EEPROM)	4 Mbit (External Flash)	128 kB	N/A	N/A	N/A	N/A	x	x	N/A	N/A	N/A
Mica2	MEMSIC	N/A	2003	AVR	Atmel ATmega128L	8 MHz	32 kHz	x	N/A	N/A	N/A	x	Chipcon CC1000	N/A	N/A	x	N/A	1	1	2	53	2	N/A	8x10 bit	N/A	2x8 bit & 2x16 bit	x	RS232	x	x	x	x	N/A	x	N/A	N/A	x	Magnetic	24.3	24.3	N/A	N/A	15 μA	8 mA	9.6 mA	16.5 mA	N/A	N/A	N/A	4 kB	4 kB (EEPROM)	N/A	128 kB	N/A	N/A	N/A	N/A	x	x	N/A	N/A	N/A
Mica2Dot	University of California, Berkeley/Crossbow	N/A	2003	AVR	Atmel ATmega128L	8 MHz	32 kHz	x	N/A	N/A	N/A	N/A	Chipcon CC1000	N/A	N/A	x	N/A	1	1	2	53	2	N/A	8x10 bit	N/A	2x8 bit & 2x16 bit	x	N/A	x	N/A	N/A	N/A	N/A	N/A	N/A	N/A	N/A	Battery Monitor	25	6	N/A	Lithium 3B45 (1000 mAh, 2.7-3.3 V)	15 μA	8 mA	10 mA	27 mA	N/A	N/A	N/A	4 kB	4 kB (EEPROM)	512 kB (Serial Flash)	128 kB	N/A	N/A	N/A	N/A	x	x	N/A	N/A	N/A
MicaZ	MEMSIC	N/A	2004	AVR	Atmel ATmega128L	8 MHz	32 kHz	x	N/A	N/A	N/A	x	Chipcon CC2420	x	N/A	x	N/A	1	1	2	53	2	N/A	8x10 bit	N/A	2x8 bit & 2x16 bit	x	N/A	M	M	M	M	N/A	M	N/A	N/A	M	Magnetic (M)	58	32	7	2xAA or External Power (2.7-3.3 V)	< 15 μA	8 mA	19.7 mA	11–17.4 mA	N/A	x	x	4 kB	4 kB (EEPROM)	512 kB	128 kB	N/A	N/A	N/A	N/A	x	x	N/A	N/A	N/A
Micromote	University of California, Berkeley	Deprecated	1999	RISC	Atmel AT90S8535	8 MHz	32 kHz	x	N/A	N/A	N/A	N/A	RFMonolithics TR1000	N/A	N/A	x	N/A	N/A	1	1	32	N/A	N/A	8x10 bit	N/A	2x8 bit & 1x16 bit	N/A	N/A	N/A	N/A	N/A	N/A	N/A	N/A	N/A	N/A	N/A	N/A	N/A	N/A	N/A	N/A	1 μA	6.4 mA	1.8-3.8 mA	12 mA	N/A	N/A	N/A	512 B	512 B (EEPROM)	N/A	8 kB	N/A	N/A	N/A	N/A	x	x	N/A	N/A	N/A
MITes	Massachusetts Institute of Technology	Deprecated	2004	N/A	Nordic Semiconductor nRF24E1 SoC	16 MHz	N/A	N/A	N/A	N/A	N/A	N/A	Nordic Semiconductor nRF24E1	N/A	N/A	N/A	N/A	N/A	1	1	11	N/A	N/A	9x6/12 bit	N/A	2x8 bit & 1x16 bit	N/A	N/A	N/A	N/A	N/A	N/A	N/A	N/A	N/A	N/A	N/A	N/A	N/A	N/A	N/A	1.9-3.6 V	2 μA	3 mA	19 mA	13 mA	N/A	N/A	N/A	512 B	N/A	N/A	4 kB	N/A	N/A	N/A	N/A	N/A	N/A	N/A	N/A	N/A
Monnit Wit	Monnit	Deprecated	2009	N/A	N/A	900 MHz	N/A	N/A	N/A	N/A	x	N/A	x	x	N/A	N/A	N/A	N/A	N/A	N/A	N/A	N/A	N/A	N/A	N/A	N/A	N/A	N/A	N/A	N/A	N/A	N/A	N/A	x	N/A	N/A	N/A	N/A	N/A	N/A	N/A	N/A	N/A	N/A	N/A	N/A	N/A	N/A	N/A	N/A	N/A	N/A	N/A	N/A	N/A	N/A	N/A	N/A	N/A	N/A	N/A	N/A
mPlatform	Microsoft	N/A	2007	RISC/RISC/-	TI MSP430F1611/OKI ML67Q5003/XC2C512	8/60/32-200 MHz	N/A	N/A	N/A	mPlatform	N/A	N/A	Chipcon CC2420	x	N/A	N/A	N/A	1/x/-	2/-/-	2/x/-	48/x/-	1-2/-/-	N/A	8x12/10/- bit	12/-/- bit	2x16/-/- bit	x	N/A	N/A	N/A	N/A	N/A	N/A	N/A	N/A	N/A	N/A	N/A	N/A	N/A	N/A	N/A	N/A	N/A	18.8-19.7 mA	17.4 mA	N/A	N/A	N/A	10/32/- kB	-/4/- kB	N/A	48/512/- kB	N/A	N/A	N/A	N/A	N/A	N/A	N/A	N/A	N/A
MTM-CM3000-MSP ^{,}^{,}^{,}^{,}^{,}^{,}	AdvanticSys	80 euros	2011	RISC	TI MSP430F1611	8 MHz	N/A	v2.x	x	N/A	N/A	N/A	Chipcon CC2420	x	N/A	x	N/A	1	2	2	48	1-2	N/A	8x12 bit	12 bit	2x16 bit	x	IrDA (M)	x/M	M	M	N/A	N/A	M	M	N/A	M	CO (M); Magnetic (M); Buzzer (M); Force & Load (M); Tilt (M); Dust (M)	72.80	38.50	13.30	2xAA (3.0 V)	1 μA	N/A	18.8-19.7 mA	17.4 mA	N/A	N/A	N/A	10 kB	N/A	1 MB (External Flash)	48 kB	x	x	x	x	x	x	x	N/A	N/A
MTM-CM3300-MSP ^{,}^{,}^{,}^{,}^{,}^{,}	AdvanticSys	105 euros	2011	RISC	TI MSP430F1611	8 MHz	N/A	v2.x	x	N/A	N/A	N/A	Chipcon CC2420	x	N/A	x	N/A	1	2	2	48	1-2	N/A	8x12 bit	12 bit	2x16 bit	x	IrDA (M)	x/M	M	M	N/A	N/A	M	M	N/A	M	CO (M); Magnetic (M); Buzzer (M); Force & Load (M); Tilt (M); Dust (M)	84.40	36.25	13.30	2xAA (3.0 V)	5 mA	N/A	30 mA	120 mA	N/A	N/A	N/A	10 kB	N/A	1 MB (External Flash)	48 kB	x	x	x	x	x	x	x	N/A	N/A
MTM-CM4000-MSP ^{,}^{,}^{,}^{,}^{,}^{,}	AdvanticSys	85 euros	2011	RISC	TI MSP430F1611	8 MHz	N/A	v2.x	x	N/A	N/A	N/A	Chipcon CC2420	x	N/A	x	N/A	1	2	2	48	1-2	N/A	8x12 bit	12 bit	2x16 bit	x	IrDA (M)	x/M	M	M	N/A	N/A	M	M	N/A	M	CO (M); Magnetic (M); Buzzer (M); Force & Load (M); Tilt (M); Dust (M)	68.00	38.50	6.55	2xAA (3.0 V)	1 μA	N/A	18.8-19.7 mA	17.4 mA	N/A	N/A	N/A	10 kB	N/A	1 MB (External Flash)	48 kB	x	x	x	x	x	x	x	N/A	N/A
MTM-CM5000-MSP ^{,}^{,}^{,}^{,}^{,}^{,}	AdvanticSys	90 euros	2011	RISC	TI MSP430F1611	8 MHz	N/A	v2.x	x	N/A	N/A	N/A	Chipcon CC2420	x	N/A	x	N/A	1	2	2	48	1-2	N/A	8x12 bit	12 bit	2x16 bit	x	IrDA (M)	x	x	x	N/A	N/A	M	M	N/A	M	CO (M); Magnetic (M); Buzzer (M); Force & Load (M); Tilt (M); Dust (M)	81.90	32.50	6.55	2xAA (3.0 V)	1 μA	N/A	18.8-19.7 mA	17.4 mA	N/A	N/A	N/A	10 kB	N/A	1 MB (External Flash)	48 kB	x	x	x	x	x	x	x	N/A	N/A
MTM-CM5000-SMA ^{,}^{,}^{,}^{,}^{,}^{,}	AdvanticSys	95 euros	N/A	RISC	TI MSP430F1611	8 MHz	N/A	v2.x	x	N/A	N/A	N/A	Chipcon CC2420	x	N/A	x	N/A	1	2	2	48	1-2	N/A	8x12 bit	12 bit	2x16 bit	x	IrDA	x	x	x	N/A	N/A	M	M	N/A	M	CO (M); Magnetic (M); Buzzer (M); Force & Load (M); Tilt (M); Dust (M)	81.90	32.50	6.55	2xAA (3.0 V)	1 μA	N/A	18.8-19.7 mA	17.4 mA	N/A	N/A	N/A	10 kB	N/A	1 MB (External Flash)	48 kB	x	x	x	x	x	x	x	N/A	N/A
Mulle ^{,}^{,}	Eistec	N/A	2005	CISC	Renesas M16C/62P	10 MHz	32.768 kHz	x	N/A	Mulle	Mitsumi WML-C46AHR Class 2 (v2.0 on v3.1, 3.2 & 4.1)	N/A	on v5.2	on v5.2	N/A	x	N/A	2	N/A	3	113	N/A	x	26x10 bit	2x8 bit	11x16 bit	N/A	N/A	on v3.1 & 4.1	N/A	N/A	N/A	N/A	on v3.2 & 5.2	N/A	N/A	N/A	N/A	24	26	5	Battery (3.3-5V) or External Power (3.5-5.5V)	0.7 μA	8-14 mA	50 mA	50 mA	x	N/A	N/A	31 kB	2 MB (EEPROM)	N/A	384 kB	x	N/A	N/A	N/A	x	x	N/A	N/A	N/A
MyriaNed Platform	Almende	N/A	N/A	AVR	Atmel ATxMega128A1	32 MHz	N/A	x	N/A	MyriaNed	N/A	N/A	x	N/A	N/A	x	N/A	4	12	8	78	2	N/A	16x12 bit	4x12 bit	8	N/A	IrDA (M)	M	M	M	Air & Mechanical (M)	N/A	M	M	M	N/A	Reed Switches (M); Light Beam (M); A/C Current (M); Heart Rate (M)	N/A	N/A	N/A	N/A	N/A	N/A	N/A	N/A	N/A	N/A	N/A	8 KB	N/A	N/A	128KB	N/A	N/A	N/A	N/A	x	x	N/A	N/A	N/A
Nano-Qplus	ETRI Korea	N/A	2006	AVR	Atmel ATmega128	16 MHz	32 kHz	N/A	N/A	Nano-Qplus OS	N/A	N/A	Chipcon CC2420	x	N/A	x	N/A	1	1	2	53	2	N/A	8x10 bit	N/A	2x8 bit & 2x16 bit	x	N/A	M	M	M	N/A	N/A	N/A	N/A	N/A	Ultrasonic (M)	PIR (M);	N/A	N/A	N/A	N/A	N/A	N/A	18.8-19.7 mA	17.4 mA	N/A	N/A	N/A	4 kB	4 kB (EEPROM)	N/A	128 kB	N/A	N/A	N/A	x	N/A	N/A	N/A	x	N/A
Neomote	Crossbow/MEMSIC	N/A	2007	AVR	Atmel ATmega128L	8 MHz	32 kHz	x	N/A	MantisOS; SOS; RTOS	N/A	N/A	Chipcon CC2420	x	N/A	x	N/A	1	1	2	60	2	x	8x10-20 bit	N/A	2x8 bit & 2x16 bit	x	SD Card Reader	N/A	N/A	N/A	N/A	N/A	N/A	N/A	N/A	N/A	N/A	N/A	N/A	N/A	2xAA (3.0 V)	N/A	30-60 μA	18.8-19.7 mA	17.4 mA	N/A	x	N/A	64 kB	4 kB (EEPROM)	N/A	256 kB	N/A	N/A	N/A	N/A	x	x	N/A	N/A	N/A
NWSP	Nokia Technology Platforms	N/A	2007	Harvard	Altera Cyclone EP2C20F256C7N (FPGA)	500 MHz	N/A	x	N/A	eCos; μCLinux	National Semiconductor LMX9830 (v2.0)	N/A	N/A	N/A	N/A	x	N/A	N/A	x	x	x	N/A	N/A	14 bit	N/A	N/A	x	N/A	M	M	M	Air (M)	x	x	N/A	x	M	Magnetic; Vibra (M); Buzzer (M); Heart Beat (M); Touch-Sensitive Capacitive (M)	72	51	22	Nokia BL-5C Battery (3.7 V)	50 mA	100 mA	65 mA	65 mA	N/A	N/A	N/A	32 MB	N/A	N/A	8 MB	N/A	N/A	N/A	N/A	x	x	N/A	Developed C++ Class Library	N/A
panStamp AVR ^{,}^{,}	panStamp	15.33 euros	2012	AVR	Atmel ATmega328p	8 MHz	32 kHz	N/A	N/A	panStamp	N/A	N/A	Chipcon CC1101	N/A	N/A	N/A	N/A	1	2	1	23	1	N/A	14x10 bit	N/A	2x8 bit & 1x16 bit	N/A	N/A	x	x	N/A	x	N/A	N/A	N/A	N/A	N/A	N/A	17.7	30.5	N/A	2.5-3.6 V	1 μA	N/A	14.7-24 mA	22-36 mA	N/A	N/A	N/A	2 kB	1 kB (EEPROM)	N/A	32 kB	N/A	N/A	N/A	N/A	N/A	N/A	N/A	N/A	N/A
panStamp NRG	panStamp	15.66 euros	2015	RISC	TI MSP430 (CC430F5137)	8-24 MHz	32.768 kHz	N/A	N/A	N/A	N/A	N/A	Chipcon CC11xx	N/A	N/A	N/A	N/A	1	2	1	44	N/A	x	6x12 bit	N/A	2x16 bit	N/A	IrDA	x	x	N/A	N/A	N/A	x	N/A	N/A	N/A	N/A	17.7	30.5	N/A	2–3.6 V	1-2 μA	N/A	18 mA	36 mA	N/A	N/A	N/A	4 kB	N/A	N/A	32 kB	N/A	N/A	N/A	N/A	N/A	N/A	N/A	N/A	N/A
Parasitic	Massachusetts Institute of Technology	N/A	2004	N/A	Silicon Labs C8051F311	25 MHz	32 kHz	N/A	N/A	N/A	BlueRadios BR-C11A	N/A	N/A	N/A	N/A	N/A	N/A	1	1	1	25	N/A	N/A	10 bit	N/A	4x16 bit	N/A	IrDA; GPS	x	N/A	x	N/A	N/A	x	N/A	x	x	N/A	25.4	25.4	N/A	2.7-3.6 V	0.1 μA	7 mA	N/A	N/A	N/A	N/A	N/A	1.2 kB	N/A	N/A	16 kB	N/A	N/A	N/A	N/A	N/A	N/A	N/A	N/A	N/A
Particle2/29	Lancaster/University of Karlsruhe	120/130 euros	2004	N/A	Microchip PIC18F6720	20 MHz	32 kHz	N/A	N/A	Smart-its	N/A	N/A	RFMonolithics TR1001	N/A	N/A	N/A	N/A	2	2	2	x	2	N/A	12x10 bit	N/A	2x8 bit & 3x16 bit	N/A	RS232; RS485	N/A	N/A	N/A	N/A	N/A	N/A	N/A	x	N/A	N/A	45	18	N/A	2xAAA (3.0 V) or Lithium Coin Cell (0.9-3.3 V)	N/A	N/A	1.8-3.8 mA	12 mA	N/A	N/A	N/A	4kB	1 kB (EEPROM)	512 kB (External Flash)	128 kB	N/A	N/A	N/A	N/A	N/A	N/A	N/A	N/A	N/A
Pegasus	Microsensus	Deprecated	N/A	RISC	TI MSP430F2618	16 MHz	N/A	x	N/A	MicrosensusOS	N/A	N/A	x	N/A	N/A	x	N/A	2	2	2	48	N/A	N/A	8x12 bit	12 bit	2x16 bit	x	IrDA	x	N/A	N/A	N/A	x	x	N/A	N/A	N/A	Heart beat	72	35.2	11	3.7 V	0.1 μA	365 μA	16.9mA	16.8mA	N/A	N/A	N/A	8 KB	116 KB	N/A	N/A	N/A	N/A	N/A	N/A	x	x	N/A	N/A	N/A
Pluto	Harvard University	N/A	2004	RISC	TI MSP430F149	8 MHz	N/A	x	N/A	N/A	N/A	v	Chipcon CC2420	x	N/A	x	N/A	N/A	2	2	48	2	N/A	8x12 bit	N/A	2x16 bit	N/A	N/A	x	N/A	N/A	N/A	N/A	x	N/A	N/A	N/A	N/A	57	36	16	Rechargeable Li-Ion Battery	N/A	25 mA	18.8-19.7 mA	17.4 mA	N/A	N/A	N/A	2 kB	512 kB (EEPROM)	N/A	60 kB	N/A	N/A	N/A	N/A	x	x	N/A	N/A	N/A
Power meter WSN	University of New South Wales, Sydney	Deprecated	2007	N/A	TI/Chipcon CC1010 SoC	3-24 MHz	32 kHz	N/A	N/A	N/A	N/A	v	Chipcon CC1010	N/A	N/A	N/A	N/A	N/A	1	2	26	N/A	N/A	3x10 bit	N/A	4	N/A	N/A	N/A	N/A	N/A	N/A	N/A	N/A	N/A	N/A	N/A	N/A	N/A	N/A	N/A	2.7-3.1 V	29.4 μA	14.8 mA	9.1 mA	11.9 mA	N/A	N/A	N/A	2 kB	N/A	N/A	32 kB	N/A	N/A	N/A	N/A	N/A	N/A	N/A	N/A	N/A
PowWow – CAIRN ^{,}	Inria gforge	60 euros	2009	RISC	TI MSP430F1612	8 MHz	N/A	N/A	x	PowWow	N/A	N/A	Chipcon CC2420	x	N/A	x	N/A	1	2	2	48	1-2	N/A	8x12 bit	12 bit	2x16 bit	x	RS232	x/M	N/A	N/A	N/A	N/A	N/A	N/A	N/A	N/A	Mobile Node Tracking (M)	N/A	N/A	N/A	2.7-3.6 V	1.1 μA	0.33-0.5 mA	18.8-19.7 mA	17.4 mA	N/A	x	N/A	5 kB	N/A	N/A	55 kB	x	x	x	x	x	x	x	N/A	N/A
Preon32	Virtenio	N/A	2011	ARMv7	Cortex®M3	72 MHz	N/A	N/A	N/A	Java	N/A	N/A	Atmel AT86RF231	x	N/A	x	x	x	x	x	x	N/A	OTG	12 bit	12 bit	N/A	x	N/A	x	x	x	x	x	x	N/A	N/A	N/A	Magnetic	27.5	19	3.3	2.7-3.6 V (External Power)	26 μA	3.7-28.3 mA	12.3-13.2 mA	14.4 mA	N/A	N/A	N/A	64 kB	N/A	8 Mbit (External)	256/512 kB	N/A	N/A	N/A	N/A	N/A	N/A	N/A	N/A	N/A
Programmable XBee-PRO ZB	Digi International	N/A	2010	N/A	Freescale HCS08	50.33 MHz	32 kHz	N/A	N/A	Xbee SDK	N/A	N/A	x	x	N/A	N/A	N/A	1	1	N/A	56	N/A	N/A	x	N/A	10	N/A	N/A	N/A	N/A	N/A	N/A	N/A	N/A	N/A	N/A	N/A	N/A	N/A	N/A	N/A	N/A	4 μA	N/A	62 mA	220 mA	N/A	N/A	x	2 kB	N/A	N/A	32 kB	N/A	N/A	N/A	N/A	N/A	N/A	N/A	N/A	N/A
ProSpeckz ^{,}^{,}	University of Edinburgh	N/A	2004	ARM7TDMI	Atmel AT91	12-60 MHz	32.768 kHz	x	N/A	eCos; uClinux	N/A	N/A	Chipcon CC2420	x	N/A	x	N/A	N/A	N/A	x	32	2	x	8 bit	8 bit	3x16 bit	x	N/A	M	N/A	M	N/A	N/A	N/A	N/A	N/A	M	N/A	N/A	N/A	N/A	2x3.6 V (Batteries)	300 μA	N/A	18.8-24.5 mA	17.4 mA	N/A	N/A	N/A	256 kB	N/A	N/A	2 MB	N/A	N/A	N/A	N/A	x	x	N/A	N/A	N/A
RecoNode	University of Denver	N/A	2010	N/A	Xilinx Virtex-4 FX20	450 MHz	N/A	x	N/A	RTOS	N/A	N/A	Chipcon CC2520	x	N/A	x	N/A	N/A	N/A	N/A	N/A	N/A	N/A	N/A	N/A	N/A	N/A	N/A	N/A	N/A	N/A	N/A	N/A	N/A	N/A	N/A	N/A	N/A	N/A	N/A	N/A	N/A	N/A	N/A	18.5 mA	25.8-33.6 mA	N/A	N/A	N/A	128 MB	N/A	N/A	N/A	N/A	N/A	N/A	N/A	x	x	N/A	N/A	N/A
Rene 1	University of California, Berkeley	N/A	1999	RISC	Atmel AT90LS8535	4 MHz	32 kHz	x	N/A	N/A	N/A	N/A	RFMonolithics TR1000	N/A	N/A	x	N/A	x	1	1	32	N/A	N/A	8x10 bit	N/A	2x8 bit & 1x16 bit	N/A	N/A	N/A	N/A	N/A	N/A	N/A	N/A	N/A	N/A	N/A	N/A	N/A	N/A	N/A	2xAA (2850 mAh)	1-5 μA	5–6.4 mA	1.8-3.8 mA	12 mA	N/A	N/A	N/A	512 B	512 B (EEPROM)	32 kB (External EEPROM)	8 kB	N/A	N/A	N/A	N/A	x	x	N/A	N/A	N/A
Rene 2	University of California, Berkeley	Deprecated	2000	AVR	Atmel ATmega163	8 MHz	32 kHz	x	N/A	N/A	N/A	N/A	RFMonolithics TR1000	N/A	N/A	x	N/A	1	1	2	32	N/A	N/A	8x10 bit	N/A	2x8 bit & 1x16 bit	N/A	N/A	N/A	N/A	N/A	N/A	N/A	N/A	N/A	N/A	N/A	N/A	N/A	N/A	N/A	2xAA (2850 mAh)	1 μA	5 mA	1.8-3.8 mA	12 mA	N/A	N/A	N/A	1 kB	512 B (EEPROM)	N/A	16 kB	N/A	N/A	N/A	N/A	x	x	N/A	N/A	N/A
RFRAIN	Massachusetts Institute of Technology	N/A	2003	N/A	TI/Chipcon CC1010 SoC	3-24 MHz	32.768 kHz	N/A	N/A	RFRAIN Libraries	N/A	N/A	Chipcon CC1000	N/A	N/A	N/A	N/A	N/A	1	2	26	N/A	N/A	3x10 bit	N/A	4	N/A	N/A	x	N/A	N/A	N/A	N/A	N/A	N/A	N/A	N/A	N/A	N/A	N/A	N/A	2.7-3.1 V	29.4 μA	14.8 mA	9.6 mA	16.5 mA	N/A	N/A	N/A	2 kB	N/A	N/A	32 kB	N/A	N/A	N/A	N/A	N/A	N/A	N/A	N/A	N/A
RISE	University of California, Riverside	N/A	2005	N/A	TI/Chipcon CC1010 SoC	3-24 MHz	32 kHz	x	N/A	N/A	N/A	N/A	Chipcon CC1010	N/A	N/A	x	N/A	N/A	1	2	26	N/A	N/A	3x10 bit	N/A	4	N/A	SD Card Reader	M	N/A	N/A	N/A	N/A	N/A	M	N/A	N/A	N/A	12	12	1.2	2.7-3.1 V	0.2 μA	14.8 mA	11.9 mA	26.6 mA	N/A	N/A	N/A	2 kB	N/A	1 GB (External)	32 kB	N/A	N/A	N/A	N/A	x	x	N/A	N/A	N/A
RISE Co-S	University of California, Riverside	N/A	N/A	N/A	Renesas M16C/30280AFHP	20 MHz	N/A	x	N/A	N/A	N/A	N/A	N/A	N/A	N/A	x	N/A	2	2	2	26	x	N/A	24x10 bit	N/A	N/A	N/A	N/A	N/A	N/A	N/A	N/A	N/A	N/A	M	N/A	M	N/A	N/A	N/A	N/A	N/A	0.7 μA	16 mA	N/A	N/A	N/A	N/A	N/A	8 kB	N/A	N/A	96 kB	N/A	N/A	N/A	N/A	x	x	N/A	N/A	N/A
RSC WINS	Rockwell	Deprecated	2001	ARM	Intel StrongARM SA-1100	59-206 MHz	32.768 kHz	N/A	N/A	N/A	N/A	N/A	Conexant Systems RDSSS9M	N/A	N/A	N/A	N/A	N/A	x	x	28	N/A	N/A	x	x	32 bit	x	RS232	N/A	N/A	N/A	N/A	N/A	N/A	N/A	N/A	N/A	N/A	88.9	88.9	76.2	4-15 V	1 μA	5 mA	0.25-6.67 mA	0.25-6.67 mA	N/A	N/A	N/A	1 MB	N/A	N/A	4 MB	N/A	N/A	N/A	N/A	N/A	N/A	N/A	N/A	N/A
ScatterWeb ESB ^{,}	Freie Universität Berlin	N/A	2005	RISC	TI MSP430F149	8 MHz	N/A	x	x	N/A	N/A	N/A	RFMonolithics TR1001	N/A	N/A	x	N/A	N/A	2	2	48	2	N/A	8x12 bit	N/A	2x16 bit	x	N/A	x	N/A	N/A	N/A	N/A	N/A	N/A	N/A	M	PIR; Beeper; Vibra	N/A	N/A	N/A	2.2-3.7 V	N/A	N/A	1.8-3.8 mA	12 mA	N/A	N/A	N/A	2 kB	64 kB (EEPROM)	N/A	60 kB	x	x	x	x	x	x	x	x	N/A
SenseNode	GenetLab	N/A	2009	RISC	TI MSP430F1611	8 MHz	N/A	x	N/A	GenOS	N/A	N/A	Chipcon CC2420	x		x	N/A	1	2	2	48	1-2	N/A	8x12 bit	12 bit	2x16 bit	N/A	IrDA	x	x	x	N/A	N/A	x	N/A	N/A	x	Vibration; Seismic; Magnetic; Optic; Ultrasonic; Limit Switch	N/A	N/A	N/A	N/A	N/A	N/A	18.8-19.7 mA	17.4 mA	N/A	N/A	N/A	10 kB	N/A	1 MB (External Flash)	48 kB	N/A	N/A	N/A	N/A	x	x	N/A	N/A	N/A
Sensium	Toumaz	Deprecated	N/A	N/A	Toumaz Sensium TZ1030	1 MHz	32.768 kHz	N/A	N/A	N/A	N/A	N/A	Toumaz Sensium TZ1030	N/A	N/A	N/A	N/A	N/A	1	N/A	x	N/A	N/A	10 bit	x	N/A	N/A	N/A	M	N/A	N/A	M	N/A	M	N/A	N/A	N/A	ECG (M); Physical Activity (M); Blood Glucose (M); Oxygen Levels (M)	N/A	N/A	N/A	1-1.5 V	N/A	N/A	3 mA	3 mA	N/A	N/A	N/A	64 kB	N/A	N/A	N/A	N/A	N/A	N/A	N/A	N/A	N/A	N/A	N/A	N/A
SENTIO	Mid Sweden University	N/A	2006	AVR	Atmel ATmega128L	8 MHz	32 kHz	N/A	x	N/A	N/A	N/A	Chipcon CC2420	x	N/A	x	N/A	1	1	2	53	2	N/A	8x10 bit	N/A	2x8 bit & 2x16 bit	x	Push Buttons; RFID; GSM/GPRS	M	M	M	N/A	M	M	N/A	N/A	Ultrasonic (M)	Shock (M); Magnetic (M)	30	40	5	2.7-5.5 V	0.2 μA	5-7 mA	18.8-19.7 mA	17.4 mA	N/A	N/A	N/A	4+32 (External) kB	4 kB (EEPROM)	N/A	128 kB	x	x	x	x	x	x	x	x	N/A
Shimmer	Intel	N/A	2006	RISC	TI MSP430F1611	8 MHz	N/A	v2.x	N/A	N/A	Mitsumi WML-C46N Class 2	N/A	Chipcon CC2420	x	N/A	x	N/A	1	2	2	48	1-2	x	8x12 bit	12 bit	2x16 bit	N/A	N/A	x/M	N/A	M	N/A	M	x	N/A	M	N/A	Magnetic (M); ECG (M); Galvanic Skin Response (M); PIR (M)	50	25	12.5	N/A	N/A	v	18.8-50 mA	17.4-50 mA	x	N/A	N/A	10 kB	N/A	2 GB (microSD)	48 kB	N/A	N/A	x	N/A	x	x	N/A	N/A	N/A
Shimmer2	Shimmer	Deprecated	2009	RISC	TI MSP430F1611	8 MHz	N/A	x	N/A	N/A	Roving Networks RN-42 (v2.1)	N/A	Chipcon CC2420	N/A	N/A	x	N/A	1	2	2	48	1-2	N/A	8x12 bit	12 bit	2x16 bit	N/A	N/A	x	N/A	N/A	N/A	N/A	N/A	N/A	N/A	N/A	N/A	N/A	N/A	N/A	N/A	N/A	N/A	18.8-35 mA	17.4-65 mA	N/A	N/A	N/A	10 kB	2 GB (EEPROM)	N/A	48 kB	N/A	N/A	N/A	N/A	x	x	N/A	N/A	N/A
Shimmer2R	Shimmer	Deprecated	2010	RISC	TI MSP430F1611	8 MHz	N/A	x	N/A	N/A	Roving Networks RN-42 (v2.1)	N/A	Chipcon CC2420	N/A	N/A	x	N/A	1	2	2	48	1-2	N/A	8x12 bit	12 bit	2x16 bit	N/A	N/A	x	N/A	N/A	N/A	N/A	N/A	N/A	N/A	N/A	N/A	N/A	N/A	N/A	N/A	N/A	N/A	18.8-35 mA	17.4-65 mA	N/A	N/A	N/A	10 kB	2 GB (EEPROM)	N/A	48 kB	N/A	N/A	N/A	N/A	x	x	N/A	N/A	N/A
Shimmer3	Shimmer	249 euros	2008	RISC	TI MSP430F1611	8 MHz	N/A	x	N/A	N/A	x	N/A	x	N/A	N/A	x	N/A	1	2	2	48	1-2	N/A	8x12 bit	12 bit	2x16 bit	x	microSD Card	x	N/A	N/A	M	x	x	N/A	N/A	x	Magnetic; Altimeter	51	34	14	N/A	N/A	N/A	N/A	N/A	N/A	N/A	N/A	10 kB	N/A	N/A	48 kB	N/A	N/A	N/A	N/A	x	x	N/A	Java/C#	N/A
Smart-its (Lancaster)	Lancaster	N/A	2001	N/A	Microchip PIC18F252	8 MHz	32 kHz	N/A	N/A	Smart-its	N/A	N/A	Radiometrix BiM 1	N/A	N/A	N/A	N/A	2	2	1	23	1	N/A	5x10 bit	N/A	1x8 bit & 3x16 bit	N/A	RS485; RS232	N/A	N/A	N/A	N/A	N/A	N/A	N/A	N/A	N/A	N/A	N/A	N/A	N/A	N/A	N/A	20 mA	8 mA	80 mA	N/A	N/A	N/A	3 kB	64 kB (EEPROM)	N/A	48 kB	N/A	N/A	N/A	N/A	N/A	N/A	N/A	N/A	N/A
Smart-its (Teco)	University of Karlsruhe	Depreceated	2001	PIC RISC 8-bit	Microchip PIC16F876	20 MHz	32 kHz	N/A	N/A	Smart-its	N/A	N/A	RFM TR1001	N/A	N/A	N/A	N/A	N/A	1	1	32	N/A	N/A	8x10 bit	N/A	2x8 bit & 1x16 bit	N/A	N/A	N/A	N/A	N/A	N/A	N/A	N/A	N/A	x	N/A	N/A	N/A	N/A	N/A	N/A	1 μA	5.5 mA	8 mA	8 mA	N/A	yes	N/A	368 + 256 B	14k kB (Flash)	N/A	14 kB	N/A	N/A	N/A	N/A	N/A	N/A	N/A	C	N/A
S-Mote	Yonsei University Korea	Deprecated	2007	N/A	TI/Chipcon CC2430 SoC	32 MHz	32.768 kHz	N/A	N/A	RETOS	N/A	N/A	TI/Chipcon CC2430 SoC	x	N/A	N/A	N/A	N/A	1	1	21	2	N/A	8x12 bit	N/A	2x8 bit & 1x16 bit	N/A	N/A	N/A	N/A	N/A	N/A	N/A	N/A	N/A	N/A	N/A	N/A	N/A	N/A	N/A	N/A	N/A	N/A	27 mA	27 mA	N/A	N/A	N/A	8 kB	N/A	N/A	128 kB	N/A	N/A	N/A	N/A	N/A	N/A	N/A	N/A	N/A
Solar Biscuit	The University of Tokyo/Shibaura Institute of Technology	N/A	2005	N/A	Microchip PIC18LF452	7.3728 MHz	N/A	N/A	N/A	N/A	N/A	v	Chipcon CC1000	N/A	N/A	N/A	N/A	2	2	1	40-44	1	N/A	8x10 bit	N/A	1x8 bit & 3x16 bit	N/A	N/A	x	x	N/A	N/A	N/A	N/A	N/A	N/A	N/A	N/A	50	50	N/A	Super Capacitor (5 V, 1 F) or Solar Cell	N/A	20-30 mA	9.6 mA	16.5 mA	N/A	N/A	N/A	1 kB	N/A	N/A	32 kB	N/A	N/A	N/A	N/A	N/A	N/A	N/A	N/A	N/A
Sparrow	University Politehnica Bucharest	N/A	2009	AVR	Atmel ATMEGA128RFA1	16 MHz	32.768 kHz	N/A	x	Arduino-compatible	N/A	N/A	x	x	N/A	x	N/A	1	1	2	38	2	x	8x10 bit	N/A	6	1	N/A	Si7020	Si1145	Si7020	MS5637	N/A	N/A	N/A	N/A	N/A	N/A	40	30	N/A	2xAA, 2xAAA, 3.3V(USB), CR2450	N/A	N/A	16.6 mA	18.6 mA	N/A	N/A	N/A	16 kB	4 kB (EEPROM)	N/A	128 kB	N/A	N/A	N/A	N/A	x	N/A	N/A	N/A	N/A
Spec	University of California, Berkeley	N/A	2004	AVR	8-bit AVR-like RISC core	4-8 MHz	32.768 kHz	x	N/A	N/A	N/A	N/A	Chipcon CC1000	N/A	N/A	x	N/A	N/A	x	x	x	N/A	N/A	8 bit	N/A	N/A	N/A	RS232	N/A	N/A	N/A	N/A	N/A	N/A	N/A	N/A	N/A	N/A	2	2.5	N/A	N/A	N/A	N/A	9.6 mA	16.5 mA	N/A	N/A	N/A	3 kB	N/A	N/A	N/A	N/A	N/A	N/A	N/A	x	x	N/A	N/A	N/A
SpotON	University of Washington/Intel	N/A	2001	N/A	Freescale MC68EZ328 Dragonball	16 MHz	32.768/38.4 kHz	N/A	N/A	N/A	N/A	N/A	RFMonolithics TR1000	N/A	N/A	N/A	N/A	N/A	3	1	45	N/A	N/A	x	x	16 bit	N/A	IrDA; RS232; GPS	N/A	N/A	N/A	N/A	N/A	x	N/A	N/A	N/A	PIR	N/A	N/A	N/A	2xAA (3.0 V)	20 μA	20 mA	1.8-3.8 mA	12 mA	N/A	N/A	N/A	2 MB	N/A	N/A	2 MB	N/A	N/A	N/A	N/A	N/A	N/A	N/A	N/A	N/A
Stack	Massachusetts Institute of Technology	N/A	2005	N/A	Silicon Labs C8051F206	25 MHz	N/A	N/A	N/A	N/A	N/A	N/A	RFMonolithics TR1000	N/A	N/A	N/A	N/A	N/A	1	1	32	N/A	N/A	12 bit	N/A	3x16 bit	x	VGA Camera (M); RS232	M	N/A	M	N/A	N/A	N/A	N/A	N/A	M	N/A	5.96	5.96	N/A	3-12 V	0.1 μA	9 mA	1.8-3.8 mA	12 mA	N/A	N/A	N/A	1 kB	N/A	N/A	8 kB	N/A	N/A	N/A	N/A	N/A	N/A	N/A	N/A	N/A
SunSpot ^{,}"sunspot". ^{,}	Oracle	314.93 euros	2007	ARMv4T	Atmel ARM920T	180 MHz	32 kHz	N/A	N/A	Java J2ME CLDC 1.1	x	x	Chipcon CC2420	x	N/A	N/A	N/A	1	1	1	32	4	2.0	N/A	N/A	16 bit	x	RS485; IrDA; Multimedia Card; I^{2}S	x	N/A	TriColor	N/A	N/A	x	N/A	x	x	N/A	41	23	70	3.7 V (Battery)	36 μA	35 mA	18.8-19.7 mA	17.4 mA	x	x	x	512 kB	N/A	N/A	4 MB	N/A	N/A	N/A	N/A	N/A	N/A	N/A	N/A	N/A
Telos/Tmote	University of California, Berkeley/Sentilla (Moteiv)	N/A	2004	RISC	TI MSP430F149	8 MHz	32 kHz	x	N/A	N/A	N/A	N/A	Chipcon CC2420	x	N/A	x	N/A	x	2	2	48	2	x	8x12 bit	12 bit	2x16 bit	x	Ethernet; RS232	x	x	x	N/A	N/A	N/A	N/A	N/A	N/A	Photosynthetically Active Radiation; Total Solar Radiation	65.53	32.18	6.50	2xAA (2.1-3.6 V)	5.1-21 μA	1.8-2.4 mA	18.8-23 mA	17.4-21 mA	x	N/A	N/A	10 kB	512 kB (EEPROM)	N/A	60 kB	N/A	N/A	N/A	N/A	x	x	N/A	N/A	N/A
TEMPO 3.1	University of Virginia	N/A	2009	RISC	TI MSP430F1611	8 MHz	N/A	N/A	N/A	TEMPOS	Roving Networks RN-41 (v2.1)	N/A	x	N/A	N/A	N/A	N/A	1	2	2	48	1-2	N/A	8x12 bit	12 bit	2x16 bit	N/A	N/A	x	N/A	N/A	N/A	x	x	N/A	N/A	N/A	N/A	N/A	N/A	N/A	Li-Ion CoinCell Battery (3.7 V, 300 mAh)	1.06 mA	2.71 mA	35 mA	28.9-65 mA	N/A	N/A	N/A	10 kB	N/A	N/A	48 kB	N/A	N/A	N/A	N/A	N/A	N/A	N/A	N/A	N/A
TinyNode 184	EPFL/TinyNode	109 euros	N/A	RISC	TI MSP430F2417	16 MHz	N/A	v2.x	N/A	N/A	N/A	N/A	Semtech SX1211	N/A	N/A	x	N/A	2	2	2	48	N/A	N/A	8x12 bit	12 bit	2x16 bit	N/A	IrDA	x	N/A	N/A	N/A	N/A	N/A	N/A	N/A	N/A	N/A	30	40	N/A	2/3xAA (3.0/4.5 V)	2 μA	6 mA	3 mA	15-25 mA	N/A	N/A	N/A	8 kB	N/A	512 kB (External Flash)	92 kB	N/A	N/A	N/A	N/A	x	x	N/A	N/A	N/A
TinyNode 584	EPFL/TinyNode	109 euros	2006	RISC	TI MSP430F1611	8 MHz	N/A	x	N/A	N/A	N/A	N/A	Semtech XE1205	N/A	N/A	x	N/A	1	2	2	48	1-2	N/A	8x12 bit	12 bit	2x16 bit	N/A	N/A	x	N/A	N/A	N/A	N/A	N/A	N/A	N/A	N/A	N/A	30	40	N/A	2/3xAA (3.0/4.5 V)	4 μA	6 mA	14-16 mA	25-62 mA	N/A	N/A	N/A	10 kB	N/A	512 kB (External Flash)	48 kB	N/A	N/A	N/A	N/A	x	x	N/A	N/A	N/A
Tmote Mini (Plus)	Sentilla/Moteiv	N/A	2007	RISC	TI MSP430F1611	8 MHz	N/A	x	N/A	Moteiv's OS	N/A	N/A	Chipcon CC2420	x	N/A	x	N/A	1	2	2	48	1-2	N/A	8x12 bit	12 bit	2x16 bit	N/A	N/A	x	N/A	N/A	N/A	N/A	N/A	N/A	N/A	N/A	N/A	25.0 (32.0)	20.0	1.8	2.1-3.6 V	1 μA	2 mA	18.8-19.7 mA	17.4 mA	N/A	N/A	N/A	10 kB	1 MB (EEPROM)	N/A	48 kB	N/A	N/A	N/A	N/A	x	x	N/A	N/A	N/A
TMote Sky/TelosB	MEMSIC	N/A	2005	RISC	TI MSP430F1611	8 MHz	N/A	v1.1.11 or higher	N/A	N/A	N/A	N/A	Chipcon CC2420	x	N/A	x	N/A	1	2	2	48	1-2	x	8x12 bit	12 bit	2x16 bit	N/A	IrDA	x	x	x	N/A	N/A	N/A	N/A	N/A	N/A	N/A	65	31	6	2xAA (3.0 V)	5.1 μA	1.8 mA	19.7-23.0 mA	17.4 mA	x	N/A	N/A	10 kB	1 MB (External Flash)	N/A	48 kB	N/A	N/A	N/A	N/A	x	x	N/A	N/A	N/A
T-node	SOWNet Technologies	N/A	2009	AVR	Atmel ATmega128L	8 MHz	32 kHz	N/A	N/A	SOWNet	N/A	x	Chipcon CC1000	N/A	N/A	N/A	N/A	1	1	2	53	2	N/A	8x10 bit & 24 bit	N/A	2x8 bit & 2x16 bit	x	N/A	x	M	M	N/A	N/A	N/A	N/A	N/A	N/A	Alcohol (M); PIR (M); Heartbeat (M); Magnetic (M)	N/A	N/A	N/A	2.4-3.6 V (Battery)	20 μA	N/A	12-13 mA	18-25 mA	N/A	N/A	N/A	4 kB	4 kB (EEPROM)	512 kB	128 kB	N/A	N/A	N/A	N/A	N/A	N/A	N/A	N/A	N/A
TSgaTe	TST Sistemas	N/A	N/A	ARM	Cortex®M3	72 MHz	N/A	N/A	N/A	FreeRTOS	M	M	M	M	N/A	N/A	N/A	2	1	3	26	x	OTG	N/A	N/A	N/A	x	GSM/GPRS (M); RFID/NFC (M); RS485 (M); Ethernet (M); WiFi (M)	x	N/A	N/A	N/A	N/A	N/A	N/A	N/A	N/A	N/A	70	52	N/A	4.5-12 V	23 μA	40 mA	N/A	N/A	N/A	N/A	N/A	96 kB	N/A	N/A	1 MB	x	N/A	x	x	N/A	N/A	N/A	x	Modbus
TSmoTe	TST Sistemas	N/A	N/A	ARM	Cortex®M3	72 MHz	N/A	N/A	N/A	FreeRTOS	M	M	M	M	N/A	N/A	N/A	2	1	3	26	x	OTG	N/A	N/A	N/A	x	GSM/GPRS (M); RFID/NFC (M); RS485 (M)	x	N/A	N/A	N/A	N/A	N/A	N/A	N/A	N/A	N/A	70	52	N/A	4.5-12 V	23 μA	40 mA	N/A	N/A	N/A	N/A	N/A	96 kB	N/A	N/A	1 MB	x	N/A	x	x	N/A	N/A	N/A	x	Modbus
TUTWSN	Tampere University of Technology - Institute of Digital and Computer Systems	N/A	2006	N/A	Microchip PIC18LF4620	10 MHz	32 kHz	N/A	N/A	N/A	x	N/A	Nordic Semiconductor nRF905	N/A	N/A	N/A	N/A	1	1	1	25	1	N/A	13x10 bit	N/A	1x8 bit & 3x16 bit	N/A	Ethernet; WLAN; VGA Camera; Buttons; RS485; RS232; GPS	x	x	x	N/A	N/A	x	N/A	x	N/A	Compass; PIR	N/A	N/A	N/A	DC Input (3-6 V), 2xAA Lithium CR123A Battery or Solar Cell (3.0 V)	N/A	N/A	12.5 mA	9-30 mA	N/A	N/A	N/A	4 kB	1 kB (EEPROM)	N/A	64 kB	N/A	N/A	N/A	N/A	N/A	N/A	N/A	N/A	N/A
Tyndall Mote	Tyndall	N/A	2006	AVR	Atmel ATmega128L	8 MHz	32 kHz	x	N/A	N/A	x	N/A	Nordic Semiconductor nRF2401	x	N/A	x	N/A	1	1	2	53	2	x	8x10 bit	N/A	2x8 bit & 2x16 bit	x	RS232	M	x/M	M	N/A	M	M	M	N/A	M	Magnetic (M); ECG (M); Finger Pulse Oximeter (M); GPS (M)	N/A	N/A	N/A	2xAA/AAA (3.0 V), Li-Ion Battery or Coin Cell (1.9-3.6 V)	N/A	N/A	12.3 mA	11.3 mA	x	N/A	N/A	4 kB	4 kB (EEPROM)	N/A	128 kB	N/A	N/A	N/A	N/A	x	x	N/A	N/A	N/A
U3	The University of Tokyo	N/A	2003	N/A	Microchip PIC18F452	10-20 MHz	N/A	x	N/A	Pavenet	N/A	N/A	RFMonolithics TR3001	N/A	N/A	x	N/A	2	2	1	40-44	1	N/A	8x10 bit	N/A	1x8 bit & 3x16 bit	N/A	RPM851A (IrDA 1.0); RS485; RS232	x	N/A	x	N/A	N/A	N/A	N/A	x	N/A	N/A	50	50	50	3xAAA (Ni-MH, 700 mAh, 3.0 V) or External DC Input	0.7 μA	N/A	1.8-3.8 mA	9.5 mA	N/A	N/A	x	1 kB	256 B (EEPROM)	1.5 kB	16 kB	N/A	N/A	N/A	N/A	x	x	N/A	x	N/A
uAMPS	Massachusetts Institute of Technology	N/A	2000	ARM	Intel StrongARM SA-1100	59-206 MHz	32.768 kHz	N/A	N/A	uOS (an adaptation of the eCOS microkernel)	N/A	N/A	National Semiconductor LMX3162	N/A	N/A	N/A	N/A	N/A	x	x	28	N/A	N/A	x	x	32 bit	x	N/A	N/A	N/A	N/A	N/A	N/A	N/A	N/A	N/A	x	Seismic	N/A	N/A	N/A	N/A	1 μA	5 mA	50-65 mA	27-40 mA	N/A	N/A	N/A	16 MB	512 kB (ROM)	N/A	N/A	N/A	N/A	N/A	N/A	N/A	N/A	N/A	N/A	N/A
ubER-Badge	Massachusetts Institute of Technology	N/A	2006	RISC	TI MSP430F149	8 MHz	32 kHz	N/A	N/A	N/A	N/A	N/A	Chipcon CC1010	N/A	N/A	N/A	N/A	N/A	2	2	48	2	N/A	8x12 bit	x	2x16 bit	x	RS232	x	N/A	x	N/A	N/A	x	N/A	N/A	N/A	N/A	110	120	N/A	4xAA (6.0 V)	N/A	100 mA	9.1 mA	11.9 mA	N/A	N/A	N/A	2 kB	256 MB (EEPROM)	N/A	60 kB	N/A	N/A	N/A	N/A	N/A	N/A	N/A	N/A	N/A
Ubimote1	C-DAC	N/A	N/A	N/A	TI/Chipcon CC2430 SoC	32 MHz	32.768 kHz	x	x	SDCC	N/A	N/A	TI/Chipcon CC2430 SoC	x	N/A	x	N/A	x	1	1	21	2	x	8x12 bit	N/A	2x8 bit & 1x16 bit	N/A	IrDA (M)	M	M	M	N/A	N/A	M	N/A	N/A	N/A	Smoke (M)	80	45	N/A	2xAAA (3.0 V) or External Power (5.0 V)	0.58 mA	1.22 mA	13.22-27.00 mA	24.89-27.00 mA	x	N/A	N/A	8 kB	N/A	N/A	128 kB	x	x	x	x	x	x	x	N/A	N/A
Ubimote2	C-DAC	N/A	N/A	RISC	TI MSP430F2618	16 MHz	N/A	x	x	SDCC	N/A	N/A	Chipcon CC2520	x	N/A	x	N/A	2	2	2	48	N/A	x	8x12 bit	12 bit	2x16 bit	x	IrDA (M)	x/M	M	M	N/A	N/A	M	N/A	N/A	N/A	Smoke (M)	80	45	N/A	2xAAA (3.0 V) or External Power (5.0 V)	0.58 mA	1.22 mA	13.22-18.50 mA	24.89-33.60 mA	x	N/A	N/A	8 kB	N/A	N/A	116 kB	x	x	x	x	x	x	x	N/A	N/A
uPart0140ilmt	University of Karlsruhe	N/A	2006	RISC	Microchip PIC12F675	4 MHz	N/A	N/A	N/A	Smart-it	N/A	N/A	Microchip rfPIC16F675	N/A	N/A	N/A	N/A	N/A	N/A	N/A	6	N/A	N/A	4x10 bit	N/A	1x8 bit & 1x16 bit	N/A	N/A	x	N/A	x	N/A	N/A	N/A	N/A	x	N/A	Battery Voltage	20	17	7	Lithium Coin Cell CR1620/BR1620/CR1632/BR1632 (2.7-4.4 V)	N/A	N/A	N/A	4-14 mA	N/A	N/A	N/A	64 B	128 B (EEPROM)	N/A	1.75 kB	N/A	N/A	N/A	N/A	N/A	N/A	N/A	N/A	N/A
VE209-ST VEmesh ^{,}	Virtual Extension	N/A	2010	RISC	TI MSP430	16 MHz	N/A	N/A	N/A	N/A	N/A	N/A	Semtech SX1211/SX1231	N/A	N/A	N/A	N/A	2	2	2	48	N/A	x	8x12 bit	12 bit	2x16 bit	x	IrDA; Ethernet; RS232	x	N/A	N/A	N/A	N/A	N/A	N/A	N/A	N/A	N/A	19	32	5	N/A	N/A	N/A	3 mA	25 mA	N/A	N/A	N/A	512 B	N/A	N/A	8 Kb	N/A	N/A	N/A	N/A	N/A	N/A	N/A	N/A	N/A
VESNA	SensorLab	N/A	N/A	ARMv7	Cortex®M3	72 MHz	32 kHz	N/A	x	NuttX	v4.0	x	x	x	N/A	x	N/A	x	x	x	x	N/A	OTG	12 bit	N/A	N/A	x	N/A	x	x	x	x	x	x	N/A	x	x	Microwave Radar; Microphone & Radio Spectrum; Color	N/A	N/A	N/A	Battery, Solar Panel & External Power	N/A	N/A	N/A	N/A	x	N/A	N/A	10-20 kB	N/A	N/A	32-128 kB	x	x	x	x	x	x	x	N/A	N/A
Waspmote	Libelium	N/A	2011	AVR	Atmel ATmega1281	14.7456 MHz	32 kHz	N/A	N/A	Libelium OTA	v4.0	802.11 b/g (M)	x	x	x	N/A	N/A	1	3	2	54	4	x	16x10 bit	N/A	2x8 bit & 4x16 bit	x	N/A	x	N/A	N/A	N/A	N/A	x	N/A	N/A	N/A	N/A	73.5	51	13	Battery (3.3-4.2 V) or Solar (6-12 V)	55 μA	15 mA	9mA	N/A	x	x	N/A	8 kB	4 kB (EEPROM)	2 GB (SD Card)	128 kB	N/A	N/A	N/A	N/A	N/A	N/A	N/A	Proprietary	N/A
WBSN	Queen Mary's University of London	Deprecated	2008	RISC	TI MSP430F1611	8 MHz	N/A	x	N/A	N/A	N/A	N/A	Chipcon CC2420	x	N/A	x	N/A	1	2	2	48	1-2	N/A	8x12 bit	12 bit	2x16 bit	N/A	N/A	x	N/A	N/A	N/A	N/A	N/A	N/A	N/A	N/A	N/A	N/A	N/A	N/A	N/A	N/A	N/A	18.8-19.7 mA	17.4 mA	N/A	N/A	N/A	10 kB	124 kB (EEPROM)	N/A	48 kB	N/A	N/A	N/A	N/A	x	x	N/A	N/A	N/A
WeBee3	Lucerne University of Applied Sciences	N/A	2007	N/A	TI/Chipcon CC2431 SoC	16 MHz	32.768 kHz	N/A	N/A	N/A	N/A	N/A	TI/Chipcon CC2431 SoC	x	N/A	N/A	N/A	N/A	1	1	21	2	N/A	8x12 bit	N/A	2x8 bit & 1x16 bit	N/A	N/A	N/A	N/A	N/A	N/A	N/A	N/A	N/A	N/A	N/A	N/A	N/A	N/A	N/A	2xAA (3.0 V)	N/A	N/A	27 mA	27 mA	N/A	N/A	N/A	8 kB	N/A	N/A	128 kB	N/A	N/A	N/A	N/A	N/A	N/A	N/A	N/A	N/A
WeBee3G	Lucerne University of Applied Sciences	< 15 euros	2009	N/A	TI/Chipcon CC2430 SoC	16 MHz	32.768 kHz	N/A	N/A	N/A	N/A	N/A	TI/Chipcon CC2430 SoC	x	N/A	N/A	N/A	N/A	1	1	21	2	N/A	8x12 bit	N/A	2x8 bit & 1x16 bit	N/A	N/A	N/A	N/A	N/A	N/A	N/A	N/A	N/A	N/A	N/A	N/A	N/A	N/A	N/A	N/A	N/A	N/A	27 mA	27 mA	N/A	N/A	N/A	8 kB	N/A	N/A	128 kB	N/A	N/A	N/A	N/A	N/A	N/A	N/A	N/A	N/A
WeC	University of California, Berkeley	Deprecated	1998	RISC	Atmel AT90LS8535	4 MHz	32 kHz	x	N/A	N/A	N/A	N/A	RFMonolithics TR1000	N/A	N/A	x	N/A	x	1	1	32	N/A	N/A	8x10 bit	N/A	2x8 bit & 1x16 bit	N/A	N/A	N/A	N/A	N/A	N/A	N/A	N/A	N/A	N/A	N/A	N/A	N/A	N/A	N/A	Lithium CoinCell CR2450 (575 mAh)	1 μA	6.4 mA	1.8-3.8 mA	12 mA	N/A	N/A	N/A	512 B	512 B (EEPROM)	N/A	8 kB	N/A	N/A	N/A	N/A	x	x	N/A	N/A	N/A
WiSMote Dev ^{,}^{,}	Arago Systems	N/A	2011	RISC	TI MSP430F5437	8 MHz	32 kHz	N/A	x	N/A	N/A	N/A	Chipcon CC2520	x	N/A	x	x	4	4	4	87	N/A	x	16x12 bit	N/A	3x16 bit	x	IrDA (M)	x	M	x	N/A	N/A	x	M	M	M	Magnetic (M); V_{rms} (M); I_{rms} (M); Power Factor (M), Power (M); Energy (M)	68	47	N/A	2xAA (3.0 V) or Li-Ion Battery	2 μA	2.2 mA	18.5 mA	25.8-33.6 mA	x	N/A	N/A	16 kB	N/A	1-8 MB (External Flash)	256 kB	x	x	x	x	x	x	x	N/A	N/A
WiSMote mini ^{,}^{,}	Arago Systems	N/A	2012	AVR	Atmel ATmega128RFA2	16 MHz	N/A	N/A	x	N/A	N/A	N/A	Atmel ATmega128RFA2	x	N/A	x	x	1	1	1	38	2	N/A	8x10 bit	N/A	6	x	IrDA (M)	x	x	x	N/A	N/A	x	M	M	M	Magnetic (M); V_{rms} (M); I_{rms} (M); Power Factor (M), Power (M); Energy (M)	40	25	12	Battery or External Power (1.8-3.6 V) or CR2016 Battery CoinCell	20 nA	N/A	12.5-16.6 mA	18.6 mA	N/A	N/A	N/A	16 kB	4 kB (EEPROM)	N/A	128 kB	x	x	x	x	x	x	x	N/A	N/A
WSN - 3202	National Instruments	N/A	N/A	N/A	N/A	N/A	N/A	N/A	N/A	N/A	N/A	N/A	x	N/A	N/A	N/A	N/A	N/A	N/A	N/A	4	N/A	N/A	4x16 bit	N/A	N/A	N/A	N/A	N/A	N/A	N/A	N/A	N/A	N/A	N/A	N/A	N/A	N/A	N/A	N/A	N/A	4xAA (6 V) or Li-Ion Batteries	N/A	N/A	N/A	N/A	N/A	N/A	N/A	N/A	N/A	N/A	N/A	N/A	N/A	N/A	N/A	N/A	N/A	N/A	N/A	N/A
WSN - 3212	National Instruments	N/A	N/A	N/A	N/A	N/A	N/A	N/A	N/A	N/A	N/A	N/A	x	N/A	N/A	N/A	N/A	N/A	N/A	N/A	4	N/A	N/A	4x24 bit	N/A	N/A	N/A	N/A	N/A	N/A	N/A	N/A	N/A	N/A	N/A	N/A	N/A	N/A	N/A	N/A	N/A	4xAA (6 V) or Li-Ion Batteries	N/A	N/A	N/A	N/A	N/A	N/A	N/A	N/A	N/A	N/A	N/A	N/A	N/A	N/A	N/A	N/A	N/A	N/A	N/A	N/A
WSN - 3214	National Instruments	N/A	N/A	N/A	N/A	N/A	N/A	N/A	N/A	N/A	N/A	N/A	x	N/A	N/A	N/A	N/A	N/A	N/A	N/A	2	N/A	N/A	4	N/A	N/A	N/A	N/A	N/A	N/A	N/A	N/A	N/A	N/A	N/A	N/A	N/A	N/A	N/A	N/A	N/A	4xAA (6 V) or Li-Ion Batteries	N/A	N/A	N/A	N/A	N/A	N/A	N/A	N/A	N/A	N/A	N/A	N/A	N/A	N/A	N/A	N/A	N/A	N/A	N/A	N/A
WSN - 3226	National Instruments	N/A	N/A	N/A	N/A	N/A	N/A	N/A	N/A	N/A	N/A	N/A	x	N/A	N/A	N/A	N/A	N/A	N/A	N/A	2	N/A	N/A	4x20 bit	N/A	N/A	N/A	N/A	N/A	N/A	N/A	N/A	N/A	N/A	N/A	N/A	N/A	N/A	N/A	N/A	N/A	4xAA (6 V) or Li-Ion Batteries	N/A	N/A	N/A	N/A	N/A	N/A	N/A	N/A	N/A	N/A	N/A	N/A	N/A	N/A	N/A	N/A	N/A	N/A	N/A	N/A
WSN - 3230	National Instruments	N/A	N/A	N/A	N/A	N/A	N/A	N/A	N/A	N/A	N/A	N/A	x	N/A	N/A	N/A	N/A	N/A	N/A	N/A	2	N/A	N/A	N/A	N/A	N/A	N/A	RS232	N/A	N/A	N/A	N/A	N/A	N/A	N/A	N/A	N/A	N/A	N/A	N/A	N/A	4xAA (6 V) or Li-Ion Batteries	N/A	N/A	N/A	N/A	N/A	N/A	N/A	N/A	N/A	N/A	N/A	N/A	N/A	N/A	N/A	N/A	N/A	N/A	N/A	N/A
WSN - 3231	National Instruments	N/A	N/A	N/A	N/A	N/A	N/A	N/A	N/A	N/A	N/A	N/A	x	N/A	N/A	N/A	N/A	N/A	N/A	N/A	2	N/A	N/A	N/A	N/A	N/A	N/A	RS485	N/A	N/A	N/A	N/A	N/A	N/A	N/A	N/A	N/A	N/A	N/A	N/A	N/A	4xAA (6 V) or Li-Ion Batteries	N/A	N/A	N/A	N/A	N/A	N/A	N/A	N/A	N/A	N/A	N/A	N/A	N/A	N/A	N/A	N/A	N/A	N/A	N/A	N/A
XYZ sensor node	Yale University/ENALAB/Congent Computer	150 dollars	2005	ARM7TDMI	OKI Semiconductor ML67Q5002	1.8-57.6 MHz	x	x	N/A	SOS	N/A	N/A	Chipcon CC2420	x	N/A	x	N/A	1	x	1	42	N/A	N/A	4x10 bit	N/A	7x16 bit	N/A	N/A	x	N/A	x	N/A	N/A	x	N/A	N/A	N/A	N/A	N/A	N/A	N/A	3xAA (Ni-MH rechargeable batteries - 3.6 V, 1200-2000 mAh)	N/A	15.5-72 mA	18.8-19.7 mA	17.4 mA	N/A	N/A	N/A	32 kB	4 kB (boot ROM)	N/A	256 kB	N/A	N/A	N/A	N/A	x	x	N/A	x	N/A
Z1	Zolertia	N/A	2010	RISC	TI MSP430F2617	16 MHz	N/A	v2.x	x	N/A	N/A	x	Chipcon CC2420	x	N/A	x	N/A	1	2	2	48	2	x	8x12 bit	12 bit	2x16 bit	x	IrDA	x	N/A	N/A	N/A	N/A	x	N/A	N/A	N/A	N/A	56.8	28.3-34.5	N/A	2xAA/AAA (3.0 V) or 1xCR2032 CoinCell (1.8-3.6 V)	0.5 μA	0.5-10 mA	18.8-19.7 mA	17.4 mA	x	N/A	N/A	8 kB	N/A	N/A	92 kB	x	x	x	x	x	x	x	N/A	N/A
ZigBit ZDM-A1281-A2	MeshNetics	N/A	2007	AVR	Atmel ATmega1281V	4 MHz	32.768 kHz	x	N/A	ZigBit Development Kit	N/A	N/A	Atmel AT86RF230	x	N/A	x	x	1	3	2	54	4	N/A	16x10 bit	N/A	2x8 bit & 4x16 bit	x	N/A	N/A	N/A	N/A	N/A	N/A	N/A	N/A	N/A	N/A	N/A	24	13.5	2.8	1.8-3.6 V	6 μA	14 mA	16-19 mA	17-18 mA	N/A	N/A	x	8 kB	4 kB (EEPROM)	N/A	128 kB	N/A	N/A	N/A	N/A	x	x	N/A	C ZigBeeNet	N/A
ZigBit ZDM-A1281-B0	MeshNetics	N/A	2007	AVR	Atmel ATmega1281V	4 MHz	32.768 kHz	x	N/A	ZigBit Development Kit	N/A	N/A	Atmel AT86RF230	x	N/A	x	x	1	3	2	54	4	N/A	16x10 bit	N/A	2x8 bit & 4x16 bit	x	N/A	N/A	N/A	N/A	N/A	N/A	N/A	N/A	N/A	N/A	N/A	18.8	13.5	2.8	1.8-3.6 V	6 μA	14 mA	16-19 mA	17-18 mA	N/A	N/A	x	8 kB	4 kB (EEPROM)	N/A	128 kB	N/A	N/A	N/A	N/A	x	x	N/A	C ZigBeeNet	N/A
ZN1	Hitachi	N/A	2006	N/A	Renesas H8S/2218	4-24 MHz	32.768 kHz	N/A	N/A	N/A	N/A	N/A	Chipcon CC2420	x	N/A	N/A	N/A	N/A	N/A	1	x	N/A	x	6x10 bit	N/A	16 bit	x	N/A	x	N/A	N/A	N/A	N/A	N/A	N/A	N/A	N/A	N/A	15	15	N/A	30 mAh (Battery) or 180 mAh (Battery & External Battery)	1 μA	6 mA	18.8-25.5 mA	17.4-25.5 mA	N/A	N/A	N/A	12 kB	128 kB (EEPROM)	N/A	N/A	N/A	N/A	N/A	N/A	N/A	N/A	N/A	N/A	N/A
Hnode	University of Iran, Kermanshah Zagros	N/A	2016	RISC	Atmel Atmega128L	8-16 MHz	Partial	v1.x	N/A	N/A	Mitsumi WML-C46N Class 2	N/A	esp8266 chip & Nrf24l01 modul	x	N/A	x	N/A	1	2	2	48	1-2	x	8x12 bit	12 bit	2x16 bit	N/A	N/A	x/M	N/A	M	N/A	M	x	N/A	M	N/A	x	50	25	12.5	N/A	N/A	v	18.8-50 mA	17.4-50 mA	x	N/A	N/A	10 kB	N/A	2 GB (microSD)	48 kB	N/A	N/A	x	N/A	x	x	N/A	N/A	N/A

== See also ==
- Wireless sensor network
- Sensor node
- Mesh networking
- Sun SPOT
- Embedded computer
- Embedded system
- Mobile ad hoc network (MANETS)
- Smartdust
- Sensor Web
