= ODK (software) =

Open-source mobile data collection software

- Developer: Get ODK
- Written in: Java, JavaScript, Python
- Operating system: Cross-platform
- Type: Data collection, Mobile forms
- License: Apache 2
- Website: getodk.org
- Repository: github.com/getodk

ODK is an open-source mobile data collection platform that supports online and offline collection of structured data on people, places, and things and allows previously collected data to be updated over time.

ODK is primarily used for field data collection, including infrastructure assessment, service delivery, environmental and agricultural monitoring, disease surveillance, and longitudinal research studies.

== Features ==
ODK supports online and offline collection of structured data on Android devices and through browser-based web forms in low-connectivity environments. Forms can capture text, numbers, selections, dates, multimedia, barcodes, signatures, and metadata such as time, location, and user actions.

ODK forms support conditional branching, validation rules, calculations, and repeating groups for complex workflows. ODK also includes geospatial data collection functionality, allowing users to collect points, lines, and polygons, use online or offline map layers, and apply spatial constraints such as geofencing and intersection checks.

Collected data is synchronized to a server for storage and management. The system provides tabular and map-based monitoring, accept/reject workflows, audit logs, end-to-end encryption, and role-based access control. ODK includes a feature called Entities that enables persistent longitudinal records representing people, places, or things, which can be updated over time and accessed in both online and offline environments.

ODK integrates with external systems through a REST API and supports data exchange with third-party tools, including automation platforms, business intelligence software, and analysis environments in Python and R.

== History ==
ODK (formerly called Open Data Kit) was founded in 2008 by Gaetano Borriello, Yaw Anokwa, Waylon Brunette, and Carl Hartung. It was designed to be an extensible, open-source suite to build information services for developing regions.
