= Claude Wendell Horton Sr. =

American physicist (1915–2002)

- Born: September 23, 1915; Cherryvale, Kansas
- Died: March 2, 2002 (aged 86); Austin, Texas

Academic background
- Education: Rice Institute (BA, MA); University of Texas (PhD)

Claude Wendell Horton Sr. (September 23, 1915, Cherryvale, Kansas – March 2, 2002) was one of the principal contributors to the development of the applied research laboratories and the department of physics at the University of Texas at Austin. Between 1972 and 1975, he contributed significantly to the geophysics program in the Department of Geological Sciences.

Horton received his bachelor's and master's degrees from what is now Rice University in 1935 and 1936. He then worked for Shell Oil Company for a year. He studied in a graduate program at Princeton University from 1937 to 1938 and then returned to Shell about the time of his marriage.

In early 1943 he was an instructor at the Naval Training school at the University of Houston. He then was a researcher at the Harvard Underwater Sound Laboratory for about 2 years until it closed in 1945.

Horton then took up research work at the University of Texas. He completed his Ph.D. there in 1946 and joined the faculty, where he remained until his retirement in 1976.

Horton died on March 2, 2002, in Austin, Texas.
