= Sensor node =

The typical architecture of the sensor node.

A sensor node (also known as a mote in North America), consists of an individual node from a sensor network that is capable of performing a desired action such as gathering, processing or communicating information with other connected nodes in a network.

== History ==
Although wireless sensor networks have existed for decades and used for diverse applications such as earthquake measurements or warfare, the modern development of small sensor nodes dates back to the 1998 Smartdust project and the NASA. Sensor Web One of the objectives of the Smartdust project was to create autonomous sensing and communication within a cubic millimeter of space, though this project ended early on, it led to many more research projects and major research centres such as The Berkeley NEST and CENS. The researchers involved in these projects coined the term mote to refer to a sensor node. The equivalent term in the NASA Sensor Webs Project for a physical sensor node is pod, although the sensor node in a Sensor Web can be another Sensor Web itself. Physical sensor nodes have been able to increase their effectiveness and its capability in conjunction with Moore's Law. The chip footprint contains more complex and lower powered microcontrollers. Thus, for the same node footprint, more silicon capability can be packed into it. Nowadays, motes focus on providing the longest wireless range (dozens of km), the lowest energy consumption (a few uA) and the easiest development process for the user.

== Components ==
The main components of a sensor node usually involve a microcontroller, transceiver, external memory, power source and one or more sensors.

=== Sensors ===
Sensors are used by wireless sensor nodes to capture data from their environment. They are hardware devices that produce a measurable response to a change in a physical condition like temperature or pressure. Sensors measure physical data of the parameter to be monitored and have specific characteristics such as accuracy, sensitivity etc. The continual analog signal produced by the sensors is digitized by an analog-to-digital converter and sent to controllers for further processing. Some sensors contain the necessary electronics to convert the raw signals into readings which can be retrieved via a digital link (e.g. I2C, SPI) and many convert to units such as °C. Most sensor nodes are small in size, consume little energy, operate in high volumetric densities, be autonomous and operate unattended, and be adaptive to the environment. As wireless sensor nodes are typically very small electronic devices, they can only be equipped with a limited power source of less than 0.5-2 ampere-hour and 1.2-3.7 volts.

Sensors are classified into three categories: passive, omnidirectional sensors; passive, narrow-beam sensors; and active sensors. Passive sensors sense the data without actually manipulating the environment by active probing. They are self powered; that is, energy is needed only to amplify their analog signal. Active sensors actively probe the environment, for example, a sonar or radar sensor, and they require continuous energy from a power source. Narrow-beam sensors have a well-defined notion of direction of measurement, similar to a camera. Omnidirectional sensors have no notion of direction involved in their measurements.

Most theoretical work on WSNs assumes the use of passive, omnidirectional sensors. Each sensor node has a certain area of coverage for which it can reliably and accurately report the particular quantity that it is observing. Several sources of power consumption in sensors are: signal sampling and conversion of physical signals to electrical ones, signal conditioning, and analog-to-digital conversion. Spatial density of sensor nodes in the field may be as high as 20 nodes per cubic meter.

=== Controller ===
The controller performs tasks, processes data and controls the functionality of other components in the sensor node. While the most common controller is a microcontroller, other alternatives that can be used as a controller are: a general purpose desktop microprocessor, digital signal processors, FPGAs and ASICs. A microcontroller is often used in many sensor nodes due to its low cost, flexibility to connect to other devices (or nodes in a network), ease of programming, and low power consumption. A general purpose microprocessor generally has a higher power consumption than a microcontroller, making it an undesirable choice for a sensor node. Digital Signal Processors may be chosen for broadband wireless communication applications, but in Wireless Sensor Networks the wireless communication is often modest: i.e., simpler, easier to process modulation and the signal processing tasks of actual sensing of data is less complicated. Therefore, the advantages of DSPs are not usually of much importance to wireless sensor nodes. FPGAs can be reprogrammed and reconfigured according to requirements, but this takes more time and energy than desired.

Transceiver

Sensor nodes often make use of ISM band, which gives free radio, spectrum allocation and global availability. The possible choices of wireless transmission media are radio frequency (RF), optical communication (laser) and infrared. Lasers require less energy, but need line-of-sight for communication and are sensitive to atmospheric conditions. Infrared, like lasers, needs no antenna but it is limited in its broadcasting capacity. Radio frequency-based communication is the most relevant that fits most of the WSN applications. WSNs tend to use license-free communication frequencies: 173, 433, 868, and 915 MHz; and 2.4 GHz. The functionality of both transmitter and receiver are combined into a single device known as a transceiver. Transceivers often lack unique identifiers. The operational states are transmit, receive, idle, and sleep. Current generation transceivers have built-in state machines that perform some operations automatically.

Most transceivers operating in idle mode have a power consumption almost equal to the power consumed in receive mode. Thus, it is better to completely shut down the transceiver rather than leave it in the idle mode when it is not transmitting or receiving. A significant amount of power is consumed when switching from sleep mode to transmit mode in order to transmit a packet.

=== External memory ===
From an energy perspective, the most relevant kinds of memory are the on-chip memory of a microcontroller and Flash memory—off-chip RAM is rarely, if ever, used. Flash memories are used due to their cost and storage capacity. Memory requirements are very much application dependent. Two categories of memory based on the purpose of storage are: user memory used for storing application related or personal data, and program memory used for programming the device. Program memory also contains identification data of the device if present.

=== Power source ===
A wireless sensor node is a popular solution when it is difficult or impossible to run a mains supply to the sensor node. However, since the wireless sensor node is often placed in a hard-to-reach location, changing the battery regularly can be costly and inconvenient. An important aspect in the development of a wireless sensor node is ensuring that there is always adequate energy available to power the system. The sensor node consumes power for sensing, communicating and data processing. More energy is required for data communication than any other process. The energy cost of transmitting 1 Kb a distance of 100 metres (330 ft) is approximately the same as that used for the execution of 3 million instructions by a 100 million instructions per second/W processor. Power is stored either in batteries or capacitors. Batteries, both rechargeable and non-rechargeable, are the main source of power supply for sensor nodes. They are also classified according to electrochemical material used for the electrodes such as NiCd (nickel-cadmium), NiZn (nickel-zinc), NiMH (nickel-metal hydride), and lithium-ion. Current sensors are able to renew their energy from solar sources, Radio Frequency(RF), temperature differences, or vibration. Two power saving policies used are Dynamic Power Management (DPM) and Dynamic Voltage Scaling (DVS). DPM conserves power by shutting down parts of the sensor node which are not currently used or active. A DVS scheme varies the power levels within the sensor node depending on the non-deterministic workload. By varying the voltage along with the frequency, it is possible to obtain quadratic reduction in power consumption.

== See also ==
- Mesh networking
- Mobile ad hoc network (MANETS)
- List of wireless sensor nodes
- Mobile Wireless Sensor Networks
