= San Diego Supercomputer Center =

Supercomputer at UC San Diego

Coordinates: 32.884437°N 117.239465°W

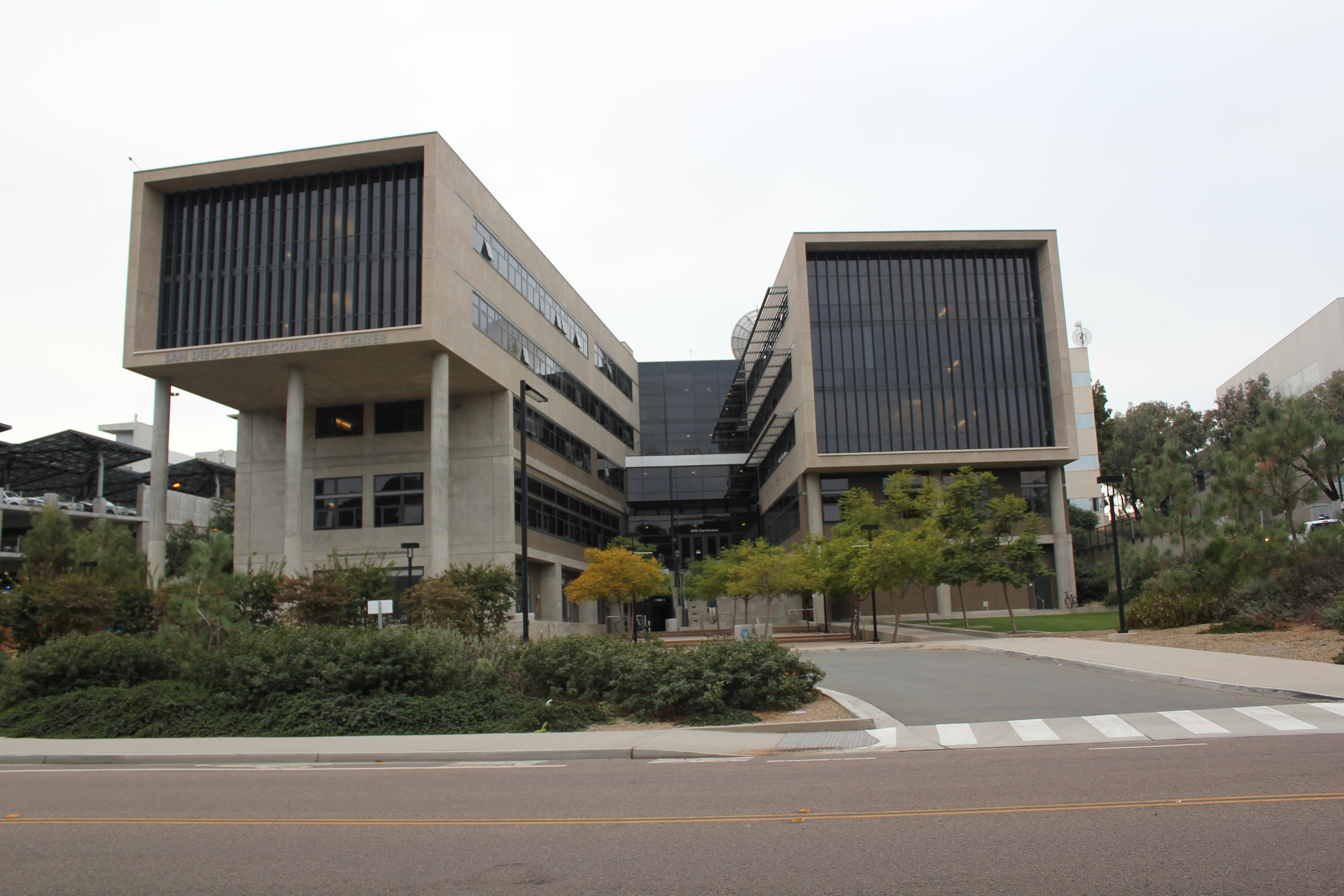
- San Diego Supercomputer Center East Wing
- Formation: 14 November 1985; 40 years ago
- Headquarters: 9836 Hopkins Dr, La Jolla, CA 92093, United States
- Services: High-performance, data-intensive computing and cyberinfrastructure
- Director: Frank Würthwein
- Parent organization: University of California San Diego
- Affiliations: XSEDE (Extreme Science and Engineering Discovery Environment)
- Website: https://www.sdsc.edu/

The San Diego Supercomputer Center (SDSC) is an organized research unit of the University of California, San Diego. Founded in 1985, it was one of the five original NSF supercomputing centers, along with the Pittsburgh Supercomputing Center, the Cornell National Supercomputing Facility, the John von Neumann National Supercomputing Center, and the National Center for Supercomputing Applications. Together, the centers form an interconnected web across the country.

Its research pursuits are high performance computing, grid computing, computational biology, geoinformatics, computational physics, computational chemistry, data management, scientific visualization, cyberinfrastructure, and computer networking. The SDSC is known internationally for its computational biosciences contributions, as well as its earth science and genomic computational approaches.

The current SDSC director is Frank Würthwein, Ph.D., UC San Diego physics professor and a founding faculty member of the Halıcıoğlu Data Science Institute of UC San Diego. Additional members of the Executive Team include Chief Administrative Officer Fritz Leader, Deputy Director Ashley Atkins, and Chief Data Science Officer Ilkay Altintas. Würthwein assumed the role in July 2021, succeeding Michael L. Norman, who was also a physics professor at UC San Diego. Norman was the SDSC director from September 2010 until Würthwein was named the new director.

== Divisions and projects ==
SDSC roles include creating and maintaining the Protein Data Bank, the George E. Brown Jr. Network for Earthquake Engineering Simulation Cyberinfrastructure Center (NEESit), cyberinfrastructure for the geosciences (GEON), and the Tree of Life Project (TOL) are especially well known.

SDSC is one of the four original TeraGrid project sites with National Center for Supercomputing Applications (NCSA), Argonne National Laboratory, and the Center for Advanced Computing Research (CACR).

SDSC is a data management software development pioneer, having developed the Rocks cluster computing environment and storage resource broker (SRB).

SDSC is home to the Performance Modeling and Characterization (PMaC) laboratory, whose mission is to bring scientific rigor to the prediction and understanding of factors affecting the performance of current and projected High Performance Computing (HPC) platforms. PMaC is funded by the Department of Energy (SciDac PERC research grant), the Department of Defense (Navy DSRC PET program), DARPA, and the National Science Foundation. Allan E. Snavely founded the PMaC laboratory in 2001.

In 2009 a combined team from SDSC and Lawrence Berkeley National Labs led by Allan Snavely won the prestigious Data Challenge competition held in Portland Oregon, at SC09, the annual premier conference in High Performance Computing, Networking, Storage, and Analysis for their design of a new kind of supercomputer that makes extensive use of flash memory and nicknamed "Dash". Dash was a prototype for a much larger system nicknamed "Gordon" that the team deployed at SDSC in 2011 with more than 256 TB of flash memory. "Gordon" became operational in 2011, with a formal launch on December 5, 2011.

=== CAIDA ===
SDSC is also home to the Center for Applied Internet Data Analysis (CAIDA). CAIDA is a collaboration of government, research, and commercial entities working together to improve the Internet. It features an academic network test infrastructure called the Archipelago Measurement Infrastructure (Ark), similar to networks such as PlanetLab and RIPE Atlas.

=== Societal Computing and Innovation Lab (SCIL) ===
The Societal Computing and Innovation Lab (SCIL) is a new lab in the SDSC. It was founded by Chief Data Science Officer Dr. Ilkay Altintas and launched in May 2025. The aim of the SCIL is to tackle current societal issues using its five primary research areas, all of which are workflows and algorithms dedicated to applying the science to real-world problems. One facet of the SCIL is its Immersion Studio, which allows a space to visualize the research using multiple display screens and virtual reality.

=== Research ===
New research from the SDSC suggests the impact of environmental tobacco smoke (ETS) has a larger scope than previously studied. In a study conducted by the SDSC, they found that cancer patients exposed to ETS had a higher mortality rate to those who did not. This research serves to advance both public health efforts and knowledge of cancer.

== Partnerships ==
The San Diego Supercomputer Center is partners with General Atomics, a defense company based in San Diego. The SDSC is affiliated with both General Atomics and UC San Diego.

SDSC is home to UC San Diego's School of Computing, Information, and Data Sciences (SCIDS). SCIDS was established in July 2024. The school builds upon the research in both the SDSC and Halıcıoğlu Data Science Institute.

Another project/partnership of the SDSC is with San Diego State University. The two entities are partners on the Technology Infrastructure for Data Exploration (TIDE) project. The TIDE project provides researchers higher functioning computing resources and storage resources. The project has most recently been awarded the CENIC 2024 Innovations in Networking Award for Equitable Access to Cyberinfrastructures.

=== 1996 Controversy ===
In 1996, there were concerns about if the SDSC would continue to be funded. This was due to differences from both affiliates, and their views of how the center should continue to operate. Funding up until this point ran through General Atomics, who staffed the SDSC, while UCSD was where it was located. However, in 1996, both affiliates applied for competing funding for the SDSC in response to the NSF's new funding protocols. UC San Diego's proposal had initially excluded General Atomics. This led to several administrative changes through the organizations but ultimately was resolved and the partnership continued.

== See also ==
- National Digital Library Program (NDLP)
- National Digital Information Infrastructure and Preservation Program (NDIIPP)
