= American Memory =

The logo of American Memory

American Memory is an Internet-based archive for public domain image resources, audio, video, and archived Web content. Published by the Library of Congress, the archive launched on October 13, 1994, after $13 million was raised in private donations.

== History ==
The pilot for the American Memory project was a digitization program which started in 1990. Selected Library of Congress holdings including examples of film, video, audio recordings, books and photographs were digitized and distributed on Laserdisc and CD-ROM. When the World Wide Web accelerated in 1993, the pilot program was refocused to deliver digitized materials by way of the internet.

== Funding ==
The National Digital Library was created through bipartisan support in the United States Congress. Initially publicly funded with $15 million over five years, a public-private partnership of entrepreneurs and philanthropists led to more than $45 million in private sponsorship from 1994 through 2000. At first, only $13 million was donated from private sectors but the project gained momentum as the years went on.

Beginning in 1996, the Library of Congress sponsored a three-year competition with a $2 million gift from the Ameritech Corporation to enable public research, and academic libraries, museums, historical societies, and archival institutions (with the exception of federal institutions) to digitize American history collections and make them available on the library's American Memory site. The competition produced 23 digital collections that complement American Memory, which now features more than 100 thematic collections.

== Beginnings ==
The American Memory project started as a two-part effort of the National Digital Library Project (NDLP). Starting in 1994, the goal of the NDLP to digitize millions of items by the year 2000 would not only be met but would even go beyond that when the year finally came. The first part or phase of the effort was piloted by the American Memory project which would have an extensive amount of the Library of Congress' source-materials digitized. Another segment of the first phase possessed the goal of establishing a way or model to somehow share or distribute such source-materials between libraries. Phase two of the project saw the continuation of the digitization of the materials from the Library of Congress but also other libraries as well. The content included in the digital library through American Memory and the NDLP is vast and includes a wide array of historical items. Some items featured include, but is not limited to, the photographic collection on transportation, Henry Ford and the automobile, the sewing machine, and Robert J. Oppenheimer. As a result of the three-year competition and all the new individual projects making American Memory more readily available, American Memory started to become recognized on a larger scale. In 1996, Time magazine named American Memory one of the top ten best websites in the United States. The website was also among the six finalists in the Education segment of the National Information Infrastructure Awards Program in 1996. The project continued to receive citations and awards since it was established in 1990 and it has also helped serve on the research front from time to time.

== Significance ==
The National Digital Library exceeded its goal of making five million items available online by 2000. American Memory will continue to expand online historical content as an integral component of the Library of Congress's commitment to harnessing new technology as it fulfills its mission "to sustain and preserve a universal collection of knowledge and creativity for future generations."
