= Globule =

Globule may refer to:

- Bok globule, dark clouds of dense cosmic dust
- Drop (liquid), small column of liquid
  - Antibubbles of liquid on top of a surface of liquid
- Globule (CDN), content delivery network
- Molten globule, protein state
