= Library of Congress =

US Congress research library

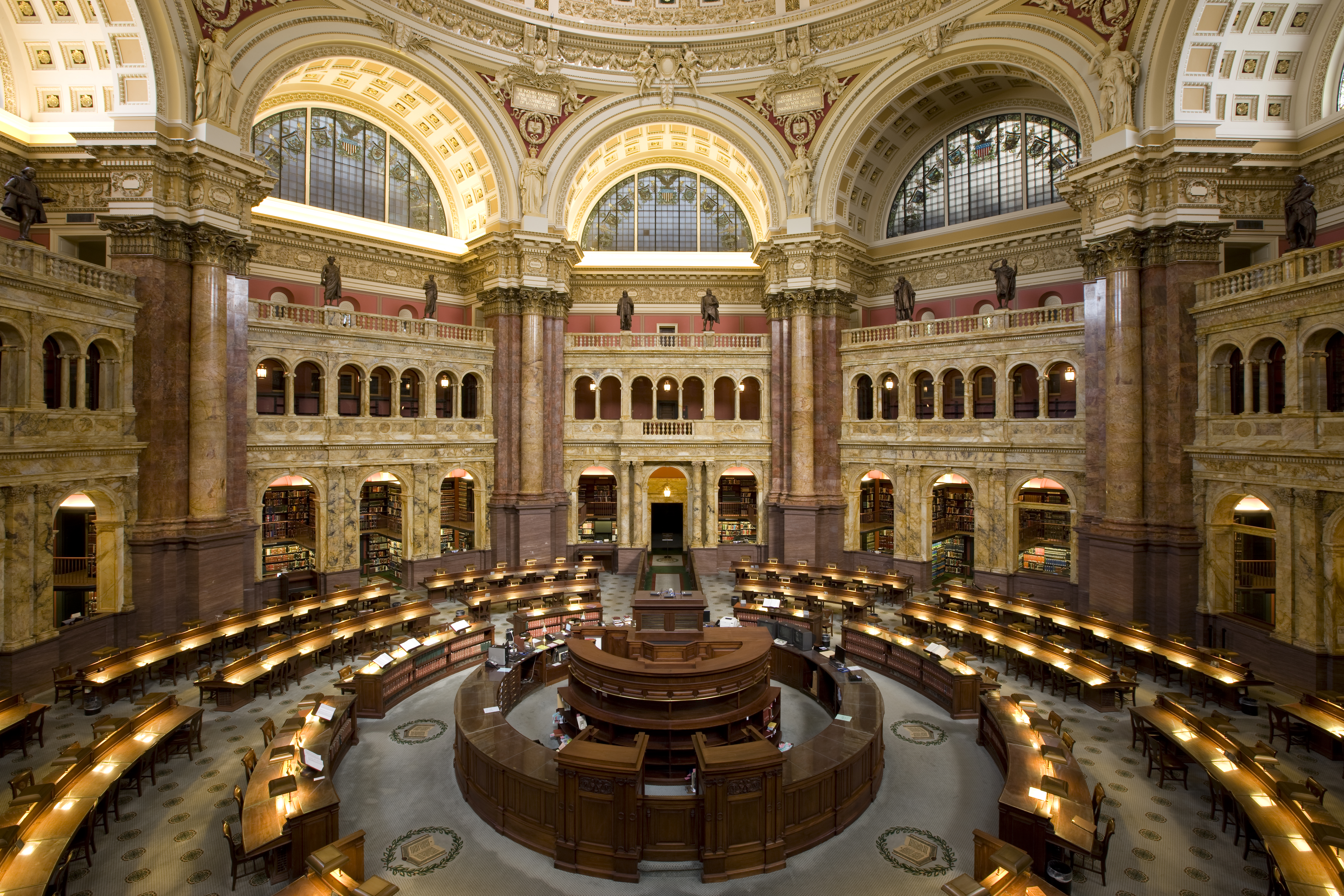
- Main reading room in the Thomas Jefferson Building at the Library of Congress
- 38°53′19″N 77°0′17″W
- Location: 101 Independence Ave., S.E., Washington, D.C., U.S.
- Established: April 24, 1800; 226 years ago

Collection
- Size: 173 million items (Note: The collection includes: 25 million catalogued books, 15.5 million other print items, 4.2 million recordings, 74.5 million manuscripts, 5.6 million maps, and 8.2 million sheet music pieces.)

Access and use
- Circulation: Onsite use only
- Population served: Congress, citizens, and international visitors

Other information
- Budget: $802.128 million
- Librarian of Congress: Robert Newlen, Acting
- Employees: 3,105
- Website: loc.gov

The Library of Congress (LOC) is a research library in Washington, D.C., serving as the library and research service for the United States Congress and the de facto national library of the United States. It also administers copyright law through the United States Copyright Office, and it houses the Congressional Research Service.

Founded in 1800, the Library of Congress is the oldest federal cultural institution in the United States. It is housed in three buildings on Capitol Hill, adjacent to the United States Capitol, along with the National Audio-Visual Conservation Center in Culpeper, Virginia, and additional storage facilities at Fort George G. Meade and Cabin Branch in Hyattsville, Maryland. The library's functions are overseen by the librarian of Congress, and its buildings are maintained by the architect of the Capitol. The library is one of the largest libraries in the world, containing approximately 173 million items and employing over 3,000 staff. Its collections are "universal, not limited by subject, format, or national boundary, and include research materials from all parts of the world and in more than 470 languages".

When Congress moved to Washington in November 1800, a small congressional library was housed in the Capitol. Much of the original collection was lost during the 1814 burning of Washington by British forces during the War of 1812. Congress accepted former president Thomas Jefferson's offer to sell his entire personal collection of 6,487 books to restore the library. The collection grew slowly and suffered another major fire in 1851, which destroyed two-thirds of Jefferson's original books.

The Library of Congress faced space shortages, understaffing, and lack of funding, until the American Civil War increased the importance of legislative research to meet the demands of a growing federal government. In 1870, the library gained the right to receive two copies of every copyrightable work printed in the United States; it also built its collections through acquisitions and donations. Between 1890 and 1897, a new library building, now the Thomas Jefferson Building, was constructed. Two additional buildings, the John Adams Building (opened in 1939) and the James Madison Memorial Building (opened in 1980), were later added.

The LC's Congressional Research Service provides objective non-partisan research to Congress to assist it in passing legislation. The library is open to the public for research, although only members of Congress, their staff, and library employees may borrow materials for use outside the library.

== History ==
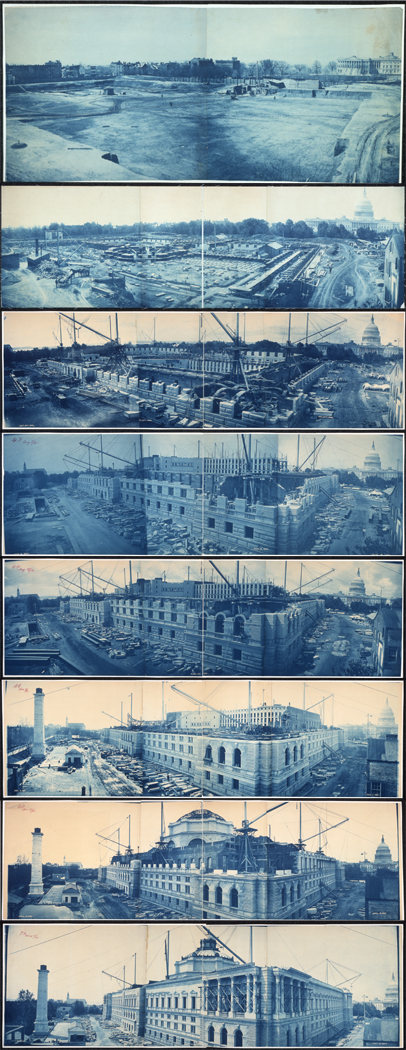
A series of photographs depicting the construction of the Thomas Jefferson Building between 1888 and 1894

=== 1800–1851: Origin and Jefferson's contribution ===
In 1783, James Madison, a Founding Father and the nation's fourth president, proposed creating a congressional library, but failed to gain necessary support for the idea. After the American Revolutionary War, however, the Philadelphia Library Company and New York Society Library served as surrogate congressional libraries when Congress convened in those cities.

On April 24, 1800, the Library of Congress was established when John Adams, the nation's second president, signed an act of Congress, which appropriated $5,000 "for the purchase of such books as may be necessary for the use of Congress...and for fitting up a suitable apartment for containing them." Books were ordered from London, forming a collection of 740 books and three maps housed in the new United States Capitol.

Adams' successor as U.S. president, Thomas Jefferson, also played a crucial role in shaping development of the Library of Congress. On January 26, 1802, Jefferson signed a bill allowing the president to appoint the librarian of Congress and establishing a Joint Committee on the Library to oversee it. The law also extended borrowing privileges to the president and vice president.

In August 1814, British forces occupied Washington and, in retaliation for American acts of destruction in Canada, burned several federal government buildings. Among the buildings burnt was the Library of Congress, which saw over 3,000 of its volumes destroyed. These volumes were held in the Senate wing of the Capitol; one surviving volume was a government account book from 1810. The volume was taken by British Admiral George Cockburn as a souvenir, and was later returned to the U.S. in 1940 by his family.

Within a month, Jefferson offered to sell his large personal library as a replacement. He had reconstituted his own collection after losing part of it to a fire. Congress accepted the offer in January 1815, appropriating $23,950 to purchase his 6,487 books. Some House members, including New Hampshire representative Daniel Webster, opposed the purchase, wanting to exclude "books of an atheistical, irreligious, and immoral tendency".

Jefferson's collection, gathered over 50 years, covered various subjects and languages, including topics not typically found in a legislative library. He believed all subjects had a place in the Library of Congress, stating:

I do not know that it contains any branch of science which Congress would wish to exclude from their collection; there is, in fact, no subject to which a Member of Congress may not have occasion to refer.

Jefferson's library was a working collection for a scholar, not for display. It doubled the size of the original library, transforming it from a specialist's library to a more general one. He organized his books based on Francis Bacon's organization of knowledge, grouping them into Memory, Reason, and Imagination with 44 subdivisions. The library used this scheme until the late 19th century when librarian Herbert Putnam introduced the Library of Congress Classification, now applying to over 138 million items.

A February 24, 1824, report from the Committee of Ways and Means recommended a $5,000 appropriation for the Library of Congress, noting the need to improve its collections in "Law, Politics, Commerce, History, and Geography," which were crucial for Congress.

=== 1851–1865: Weakening ===
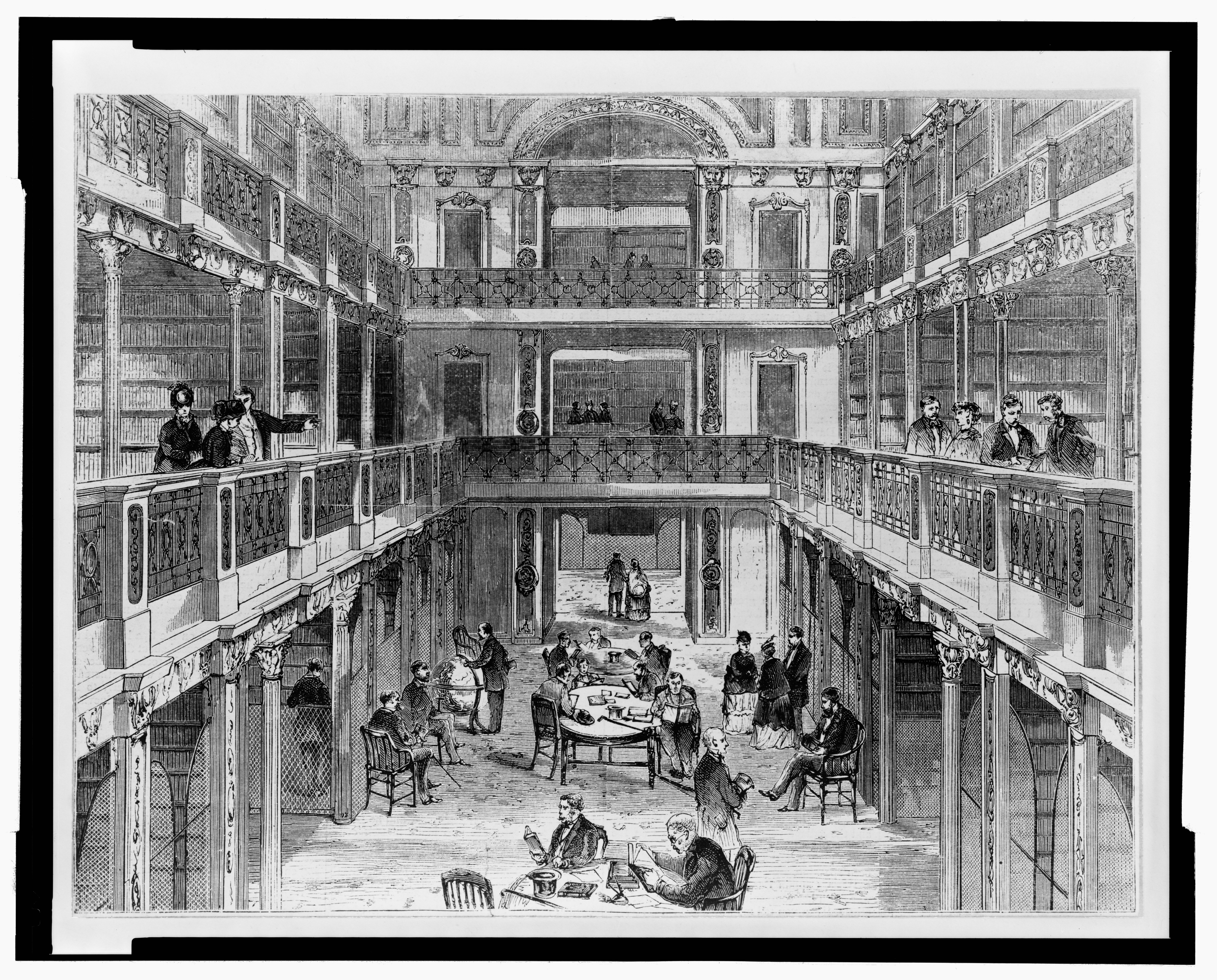
The Library of Congress, then located in the Capitol Building in 1853

On December 24, 1851, the largest fire in the library's history destroyed 35,000 books, two-thirds of the library's collection, and two-thirds of Thomas Jefferson's original transfer. Congress appropriated $168,700 to replace the lost books in 1852 but not to acquire new materials. (By 2008, the librarians of Congress had found replacements for all but 300 of the works that had been documented as being in Jefferson's original collection.) This marked the start of a conservative period in the library's administration by librarian John Silva Meehan and joint committee chairman James A. Pearce, who restricted the library's activities. Meehan and Pearce's views about a restricted scope for the Library of Congress reflected those shared by members of Congress.

While Meehan was a librarian, he supported and perpetuated the notion that "the congressional library should play a limited role on the national scene and that its collections, by and large, should emphasize American materials of obvious use to the U.S. Congress." In 1859, Congress transferred the library's public document distribution activities to the Department of the Interior and its international book exchange program to the Department of State.

During the 1850s, Smithsonian Institution librarian Charles Coffin Jewett aggressively tried to develop the Smithsonian as the United States national library. His efforts were rejected by Smithsonian secretary Joseph Henry, who advocated a focus on scientific research and publication. To reinforce his intentions for the Smithsonian, Henry established laboratories, developed a robust physical sciences library, and started the Smithsonian Contributions to Knowledge, the first of many publications intended to disseminate research results. For Henry, the Library of Congress was the obvious choice as the national library. Unable to resolve the conflict, Henry dismissed Jewett in July 1854.

In 1865, the Smithsonian building, also called the Castle due to its Norman architectural style, was severely damaged by fire. This incident presented Henry with an opportunity related to the Smithsonian's non-scientific library. Around this time, the Library of Congress was planning to build and relocate to the new Thomas Jefferson Building, designed to be fireproof. Authorized by an act of Congress, Henry transferred the Smithsonian's non-scientific library of 40,000 volumes to the Library of Congress in 1866.

In 1861, President Abraham Lincoln appointed John G. Stephenson as Librarian of Congress; the appointment is regarded as the most political to date. Stephenson was a physician and spent equal time serving as librarian and as a physician in the Union Army. He could manage this division of interest because he hired Ainsworth Rand Spofford as his assistant. Despite his new job, Stephenson focused on the war. Three weeks into his term as Librarian of Congress, he left Washington, D.C., to serve as a volunteer aide-de-camp at the battles of Chancellorsville and Gettysburg during the American Civil War. Stephenson's hiring of Spofford, who directed the library in his absence, may have been his most significant achievement.

=== 1865–1897: Spofford's expansion ===
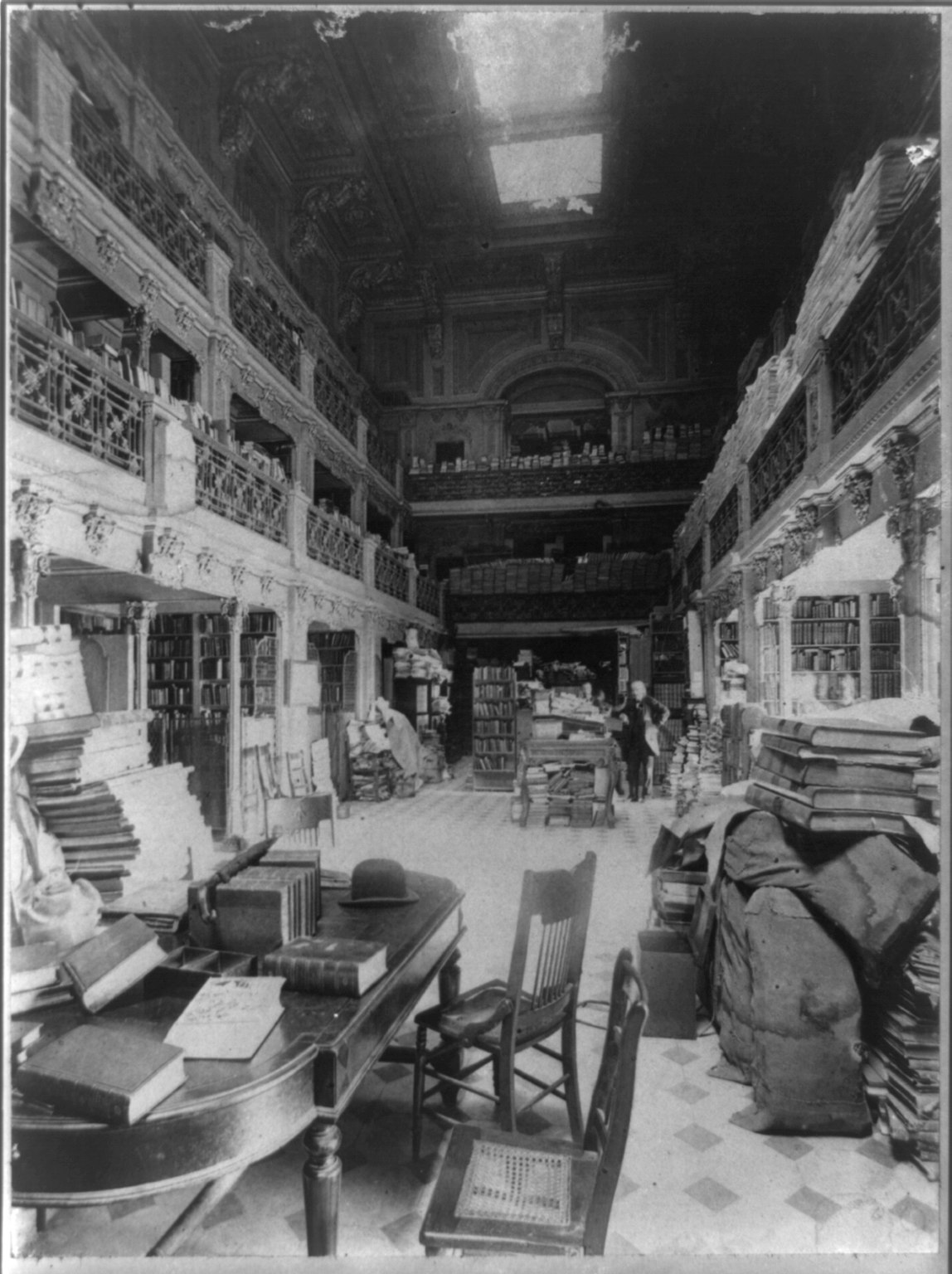
Library of Congress in the Capitol Building in the 1890s

Librarian Ainsworth Rand Spofford, who directed the Library of Congress from 1865 to 1897, built broad bipartisan support to develop it as a national library and a legislative resource. He was aided by expansion of the federal government after the war and a favorable political climate. He began comprehensively collecting Americana and American literature, led the construction of a new building to house the library, and transformed the librarian of Congress position into one of strength and independence. Between 1865 and 1870, Congress appropriated funds for the construction of the Thomas Jefferson Building, placed all copyright registration and deposit activities under the library's control, and restored the international book exchange. The library also acquired the vast libraries of the Smithsonian and of historian Peter Force, strengthening its scientific and Americana collections significantly. By 1876, the Library of Congress had 300,000 volumes; it was tied with the Boston Public Library as the nation's largest library. It moved from the Capitol building to its new headquarters in 1897 with more than 840,000 volumes, 40 percent of which had been acquired through copyright deposit.

A year before the library's relocation, the Joint Library Committee held hearings to assess the condition of the library and plan for its future growth and possible reorganization. Spofford and six experts sent by the American Library Association testified that the library should continue its expansion to become a true national library. Based on the hearings, Congress authorized a budget that allowed the library to more than double its staff, from 42 to 108 persons. Senators Justin Morrill of Vermont and Daniel W. Voorhees of Indiana were particularly helpful in gaining this support. The library also established new administrative units for all aspects of the collection. In its bill, Congress strengthened the role of librarian of Congress: it became responsible for governing the library and making staff appointments. As with presidential Cabinet appointments, the Senate was required to approve presidential appointees to the position.

In 1893, Elizabeth Dwyer became the first woman to be appointed to the staff of the library.

=== 1897–1939: Post-reorganization ===
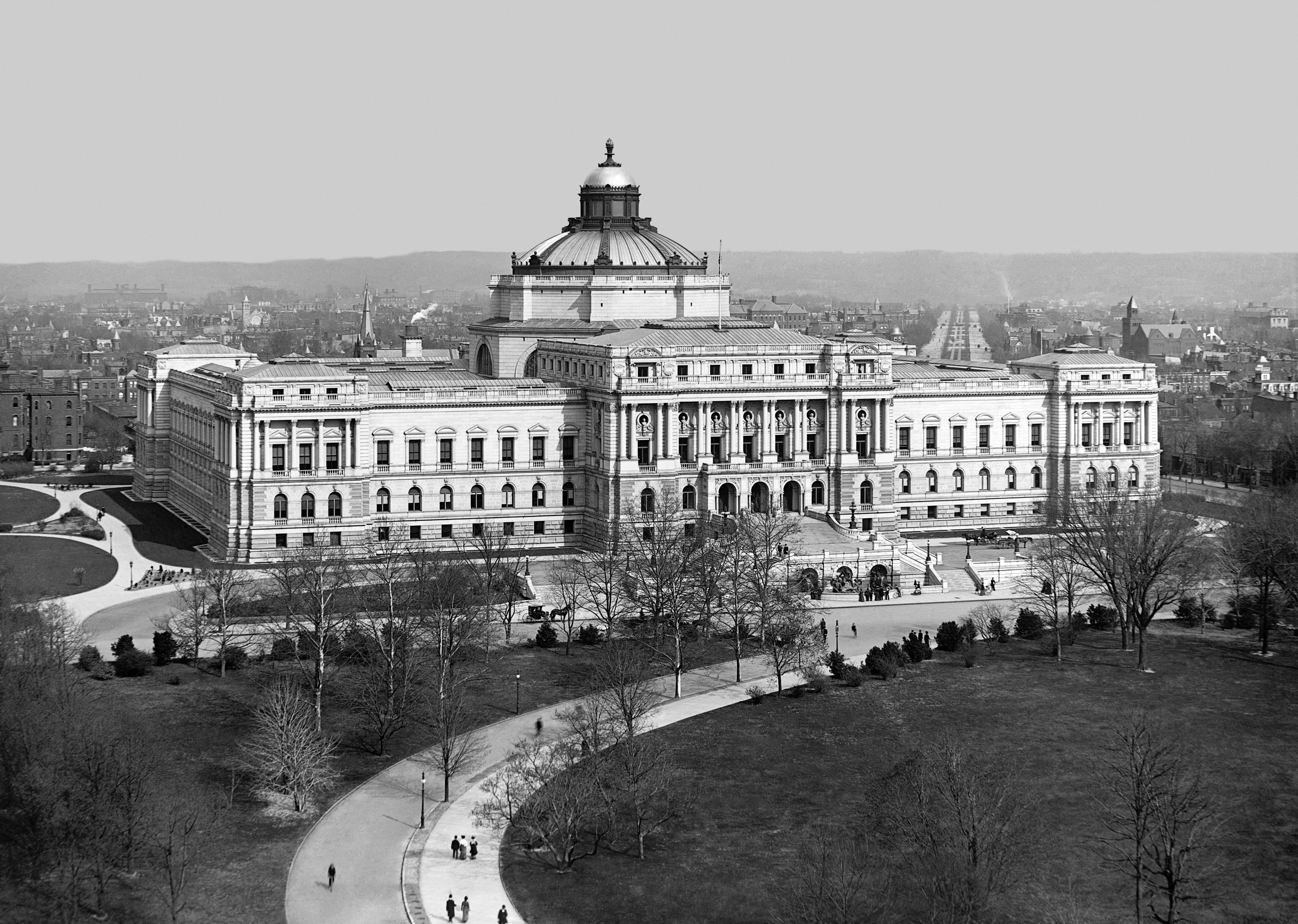
A 1902 aerial view from the United States Capitol of the five-year old Library of Congress in its new building that was renamed the Thomas Jefferson Building in 1980 in honor of Thomas Jefferson

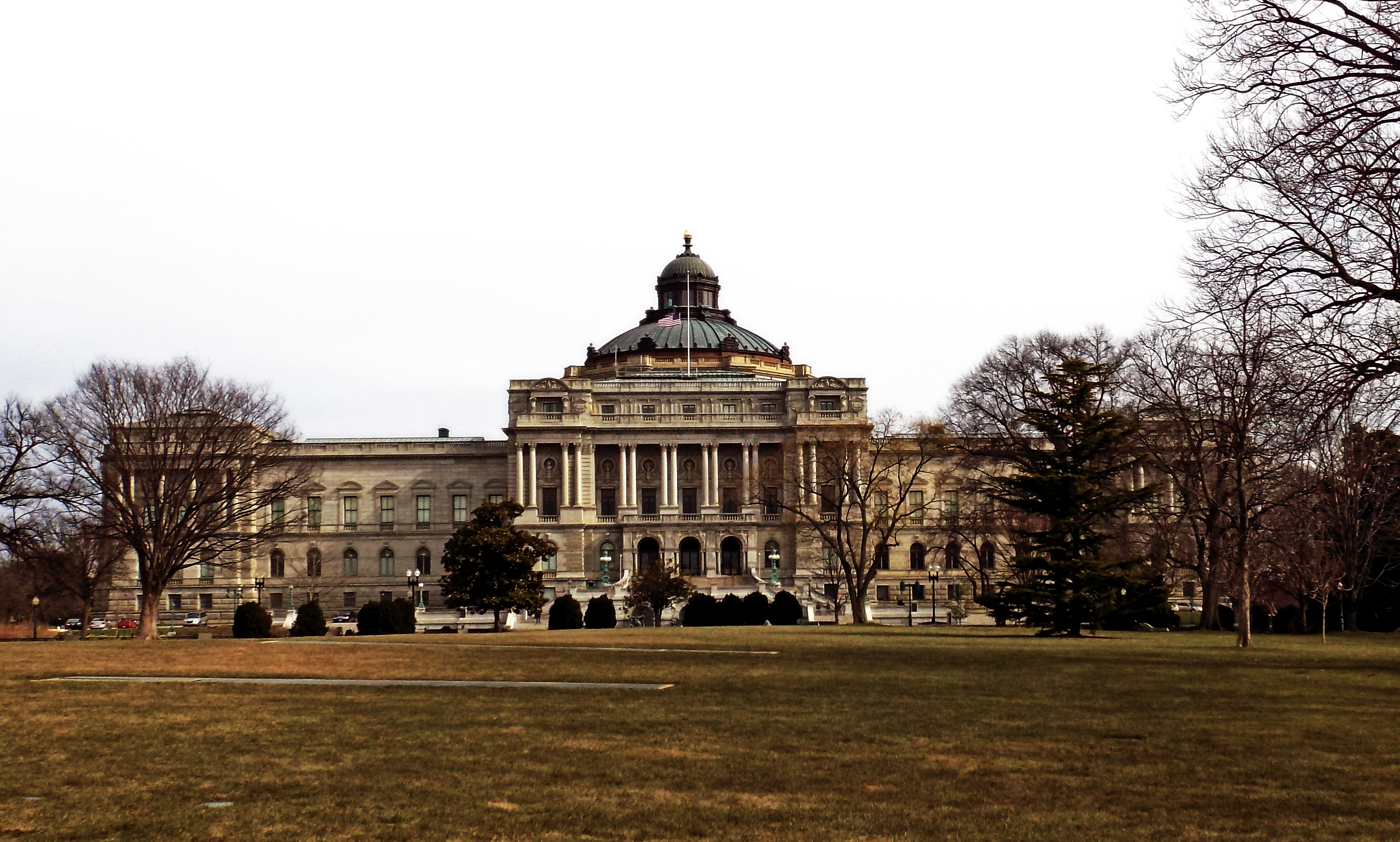
Thomas Jefferson Building, built 1890–1897, the Library of Congress's main building, on Capitol Hill, Washington, D.C., showing West side colonnade of Jefferson Building, viewed from across First Street and the grounds of the East Front of the U.S. Capitol

With this support and the 1897 reorganization upon moving into its new home, the Library of Congress began to grow and develop more rapidly. Librarian Spofford's successor John Russell Young overhauled the library's bureaucracy, used his connections as a former diplomat to acquire more materials from around the world, and established the library's first assistance programs for the blind and physically disabled, with the establishment of the National Library Service for the Blind and Print Disabled.

Librarian Young's successor Herbert Putnam held the office for forty years of the 20th century from 1899 to 1939. Two years after he took office, the library became the first in the United States to hold one million volumes. Putnam focused his efforts to make the library more accessible and useful for the public and for other libraries. He instituted the interlibrary loan service, transforming the Library of Congress into what he referred to as a "library of last resort". Putnam also expanded library access to "scientific investigators and duly qualified individuals", and began publishing primary sources for the benefit of scholars.

During Putnam's tenure, the library broadened the diversity of its acquisitions. In 1903, Putnam persuaded President Theodore Roosevelt to use an executive order to transfer the papers of the Founding Fathers from the State Department to the Library of Congress.

Putnam also expanded foreign acquisitions, including the 1904 purchase of a 4,000-volume library of Indica, the 1906 purchase of G. V. Yudin's 80,000-volume Russian library, the 1908 Schatz collection of early opera librettos, and the early 1930s purchase of the Russian Imperial Collection, consisting of 2,600 volumes from the library of the Romanov family on a variety of topics. Collections of Hebraica, Chinese, and Japanese works were also acquired. On one occasion, Congress initiated an acquisition: in 1929 Congressman Ross Collins (D-Mississippi) gained approval for the library to purchase Otto Vollbehr's collection of incunabula for $1.5 million. This collection included one of three remaining perfect vellum copies of the Gutenberg Bible.

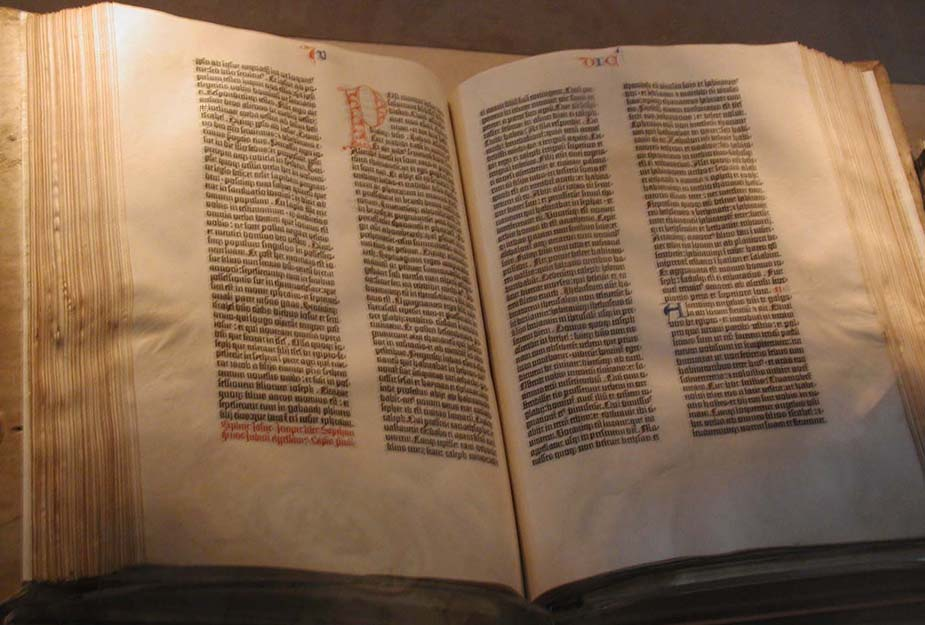
Gutenberg Bible on display at the Library of Congress

Putnam established the Legislative Reference Service (LRS) in 1914 as a separative administrative unit of the library. Based on the Progressive Era's philosophy of science to be used to solve problems, and modeled after successful research branches of state legislatures, the LRS would provide informed answers to Congressional research inquiries on almost any topic. Congress passed in 1925 an act allowing the Library of Congress to establish a trust fund board to accept donations and endowments, giving the library a role as a patron of the arts. The library received donations and endowments by such prominent wealthy individuals as John D. Rockefeller, James B. Wilbur, and Archer M. Huntington. Gertrude Clarke Whittall donated five Stradivarius violins to the library. Elizabeth Sprague Coolidge's donations paid for a concert hall to be constructed within the Library of Congress building and an honorarium established for the Music Division to pay live performers for concerts. A number of chairs and consultantships were established from the donations, the most well-known of which is the Poet Laureate Consultant.

The library's expansion eventually filled the library's Main Building, although it used shelving expansions in 1910 and 1927. The library needed to expand into a new structure. Congress acquired nearby land in 1928 and approved construction of the Annex Building (later known as the John Adams Building) in 1930. Although delayed during the Depression years, it was completed in 1938 and opened to the public in 1939.

=== 1939–1987: National versus legislative role ===
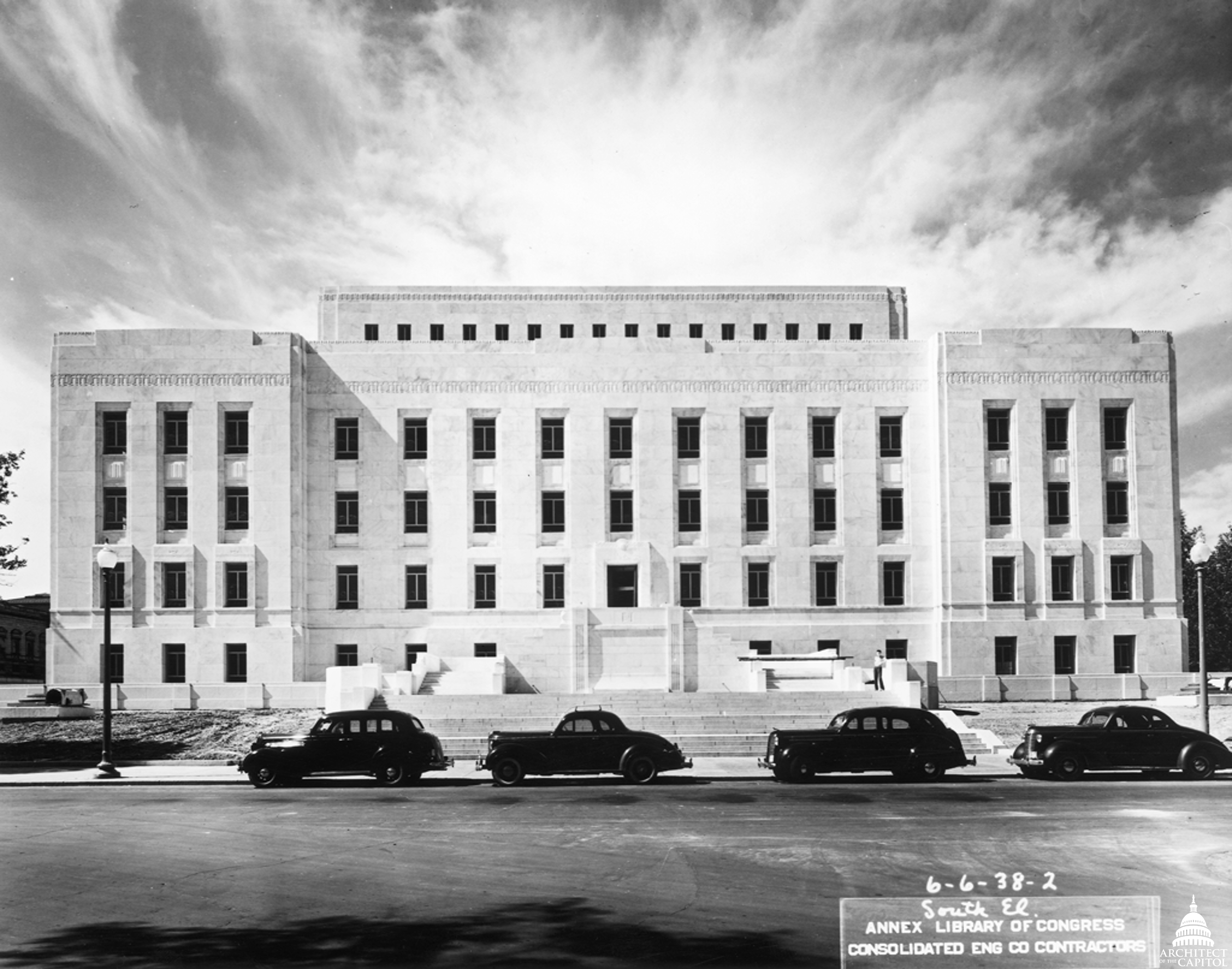
What is now the Library of Congress's second structure of the John Adams Building that opened in 1939 on Capitol Hill in Washington, D.C.

In 1939, following Putnam's retirement, President Franklin D. Roosevelt appointed poet and writer Archibald MacLeish as his successor. Occupying the post from 1939 to 1944 during the height of World War II, MacLeish became the most widely known librarian of Congress in the library's history. MacLeish encouraged librarians to oppose totalitarianism on behalf of democracy; dedicated the South Reading Room of the Adams Building to Thomas Jefferson, and commissioned artist Ezra Winter to paint four themed murals for the room. He established a "democracy alcove" in the Main Reading Room of the Jefferson Building for essential documents such as the Declaration of Independence, the Constitution, and The Federalist Papers. The Library of Congress assisted during the war effort, ranging from storage of the Declaration of Independence and the United States Constitution in Fort Knox for safekeeping to researching weather data on the Himalayas for Air Force pilots. MacLeish resigned in 1944 when appointed as Assistant Secretary of State.

President Harry Truman appointed Luther H. Evans as Librarian of Congress. Evans, who served until 1953, expanded the library's acquisitions, cataloging, and bibliographic services. But he is best known for creating Library of Congress Missions worldwide. Missions played a variety of roles in the postwar world: the mission in San Francisco assisted participants in the meeting that established the United Nations, the mission in Europe acquired European publications for the Library of Congress and other American libraries, and the mission in Japan aided in the creation of the National Diet Library.

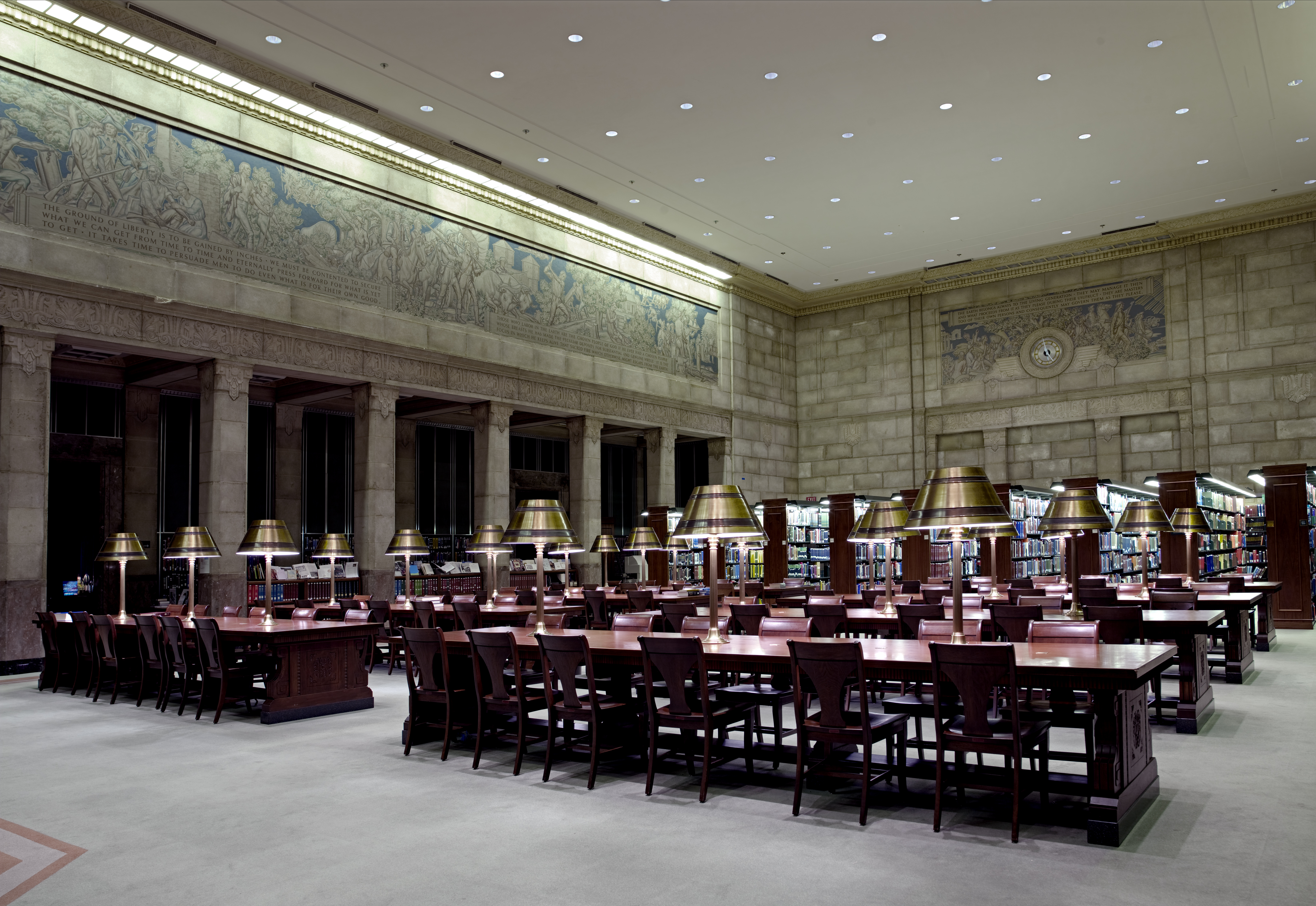
The Adams Building – South Reading Room, with murals by Ezra Winter

Evans' successor Lawrence Quincy Mumford took over in 1953. During his tenure, lasting until 1974, Mumford directed the initiation of construction of the James Madison Memorial Building, the third Library of Congress building on Capitol Hill. Mumford led the library during the government's increased educational spending. The library was able to establish new acquisition centers abroad, including in Cairo and New Delhi. In 1967, the library began experimenting with book preservation techniques through a Preservation Office. This has developed as the most extensive library research and conservation effort in the United States.

During Mumford's administration, the last significant public debate occurred about the Library of Congress's role as both a legislative and national library. Asked by Joint Library Committee chairman Senator Claiborne Pell (D-RI) to assess operations and make recommendations, Douglas Bryant of Harvard University Library proposed several institutional reforms. These included expanding national activities and services and various organizational changes, all of which would emphasize the library's federal role rather than its legislative role. Bryant suggested changing the name of the Library of Congress, a recommendation rebuked by Mumford as "unspeakable violence to tradition." The debate continued within the library community for some time. The Legislative Reorganization Act of 1970 renewed emphasis for the library on its legislative roles, requiring a greater focus on research for Congress and congressional committees, and renaming the Legislative Reference Service as the Congressional Research Service.

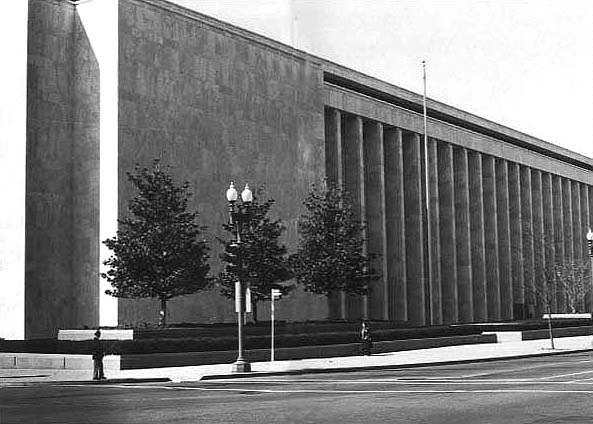
James Madison Memorial Building opened in 1980

After Mumford retired in 1974, President Gerald Ford appointed historian Daniel J. Boorstin as a librarian. Boorstin's first challenge was to manage the relocation of some sections to the new Madison Building, which took place between 1980 and 1982. With this accomplished, Boorstin focused on other areas of library administration, such as acquisitions and collections. Taking advantage of steady budgetary growth, from $116 million in 1975 to over $250 million by 1987, Boorstin enhanced institutional and staff ties with scholars, authors, publishers, cultural leaders, and the business community. His activities changed the post of librarian of Congress so that by the time he retired in 1987, The New York Times called this office "perhaps the leading intellectual public position in the nation."

=== 1987–2015: Billington leadership, digitization and programs ===
In 1987, President Ronald Reagan nominated historian James H. Billington as the thirteenth librarian of Congress, and the U.S. Senate unanimously confirmed the appointment.

Under Billington's leadership, the library doubled the size of its analog collections from 85.5 million items in 1987 to more than 160 million items in 2014. At the same time, it established new programs and employed new technologies to "get the champagne out of the bottle". These included:

- American Memory created in 1990, which became the National Digital Library in 1994. It provides free access online to digitized American history and culture resources, including primary sources, with curatorial explanations to support use in K-12 education.
- THOMAS.gov website launched in 1994 to provide free public access to U.S. federal legislative information with ongoing updates; and Congress.gov website to provide a state-of-the-art framework for both Congress and the public in 2012;
- National Book Festival, founded in 2001 with First Lady Laura Bush, has attracted more than 1,000 authors and a million guests to the National Mall and the Washington Convention Center to celebrate reading. With a major gift from David Rubenstein in 2013, the library established the Library of Congress Literacy Awards to recognize and support achievements in improving literacy in the U.S. and abroad;
- Kluge Center, started with a grant of $60 million from John W. Kluge in 2000, brings international scholars and researchers to use library resources and to interact with policymakers and the public. It hosts public lectures and scholarly events, provides endowed Kluge fellowships, and awards the Kluge Prize for the Study of Humanity (now worth $1.5 million), the first Nobel-level international prize for lifetime achievement in the humanities and social sciences (subjects not included in the Nobel awards);
- Open World Leadership Center, established in 2000; by 2015 this program administered 23,000 professional exchanges for emerging post-Soviet leaders in Russia, Ukraine, and other successor states of the former USSR. Open World began as a Library of Congress project, and later was established as an independent agency in the legislative branch.
- Veterans History Project, congressionally mandated in 2000 to collect, preserve, and make accessible the personal accounts of American war veterans from World War I to the present day;
- National Audio-Visual Conservation Center opened in 2007 at a 45-acre site in Culpeper, Virginia, established with a gift of more than $150 million by the Packard Humanities Institute, and $82.1 million in additional support from Congress.

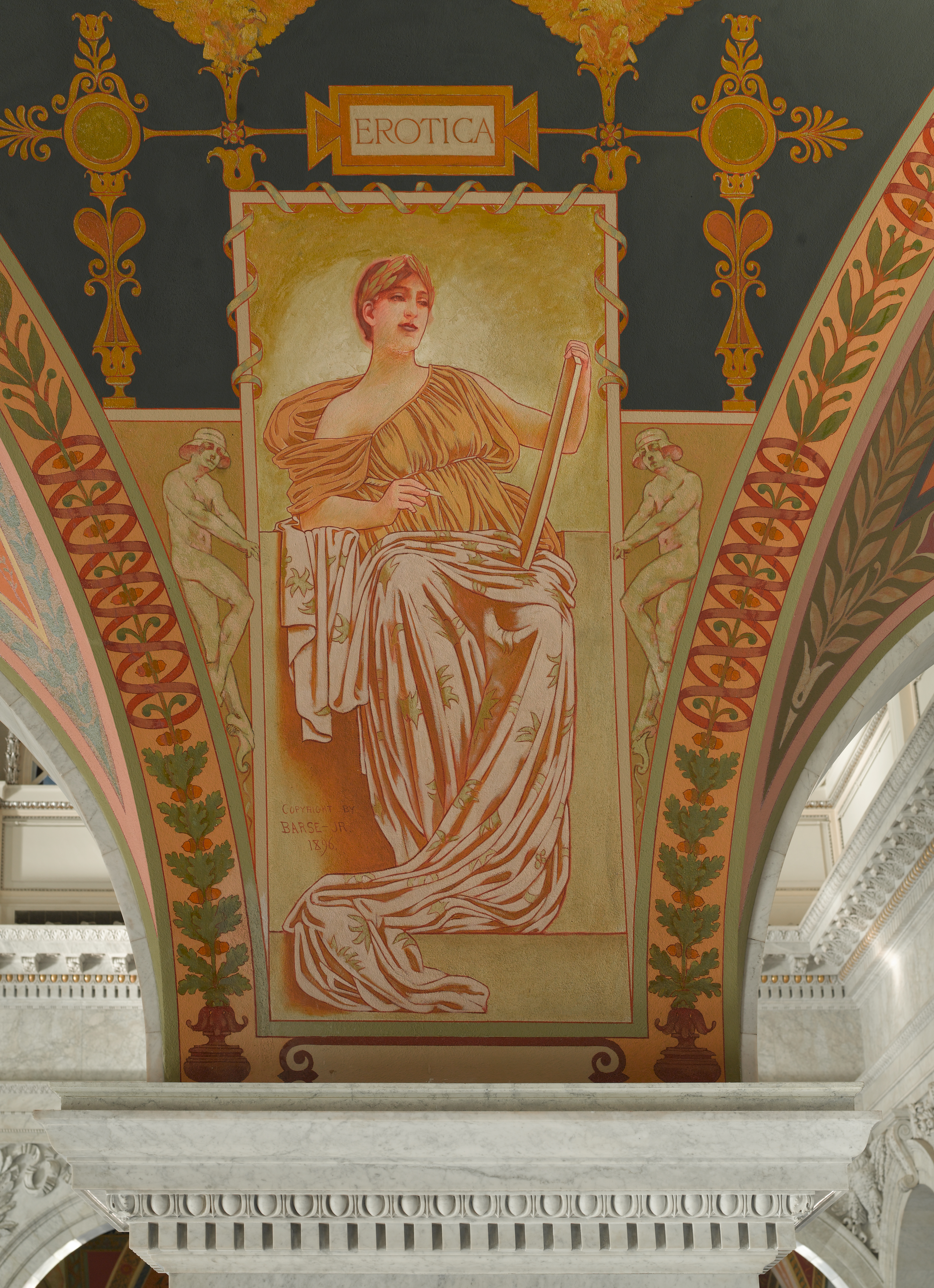
Erotica, mural painting by George Randolph Barse in the library's main building

Since 1988, the library has administered the National Film Preservation Board. Established by congressional mandate, it selects twenty-five American films annually for preservation and inclusion in the National Film Registry, a collection of American films, for which the Library of Congress accepts nominations each year. There also exists a National Recording Registry administered by the National Recording Preservation Board that serves a similar purpose for music and sound recordings.

The library has made some of these available on the Internet for free streaming and additionally has provided brief essays on the films that have been added to the registry. By 2015, the librarian had named 650 films to the registry. The films in the collection date from the earliest period to ones produced more than ten years ago; they are selected from nominations submitted to the board. Further programs included:

- Gershwin Prize for Popular Song, was launched in 2007 to honor the work of an artist whose career reflects lifetime achievement in song composition. Winners have included Paul Simon, Stevie Wonder, Paul McCartney, Burt Bacharach and Hal David, Carole King, Billy Joel, and Willie Nelson, as of 2015. The library also launched the Living Legend Awards in 2000 to honor artists, activists, filmmakers, and others who have contributed to America's diverse cultural, scientific, and social heritage;
- Fiction Prize (now the Library of Congress Prize for American Fiction) was started in 2008 to recognize distinguished lifetime achievement in the writing of fiction.
- World Digital Library, established in association with UNESCO and 181 partners in 81 countries in 2009, makes copies of professionally curated primary materials of the world's varied cultures freely available online in multiple languages.
- National Jukebox, launched in 2011, provides streaming free online access to more than 10,000 out-of-print music and spoken-word recordings.
- BARD was started in 2013; it is a digital, talking books mobile app for braille and audio reading downloads, in partnership with the library's National Library Service for the Blind and Print Disabled. It enables free downloads of audio and braille books to mobile devices via the Apple App Store.

During Billington's tenure, the library acquired General Lafayette's papers in 1996 from a castle at La Grange, France; they had previously been inaccessible.

It also acquired the only copy of the 1507 Waldseemüller world map ("America's birth certificate") in 2003; it is on permanent display in the library's Thomas Jefferson Building.

Using privately raised funds, the Library of Congress has created a reconstruction of Thomas Jefferson's original library. This has been on permanent display in the Jefferson building since 2008.

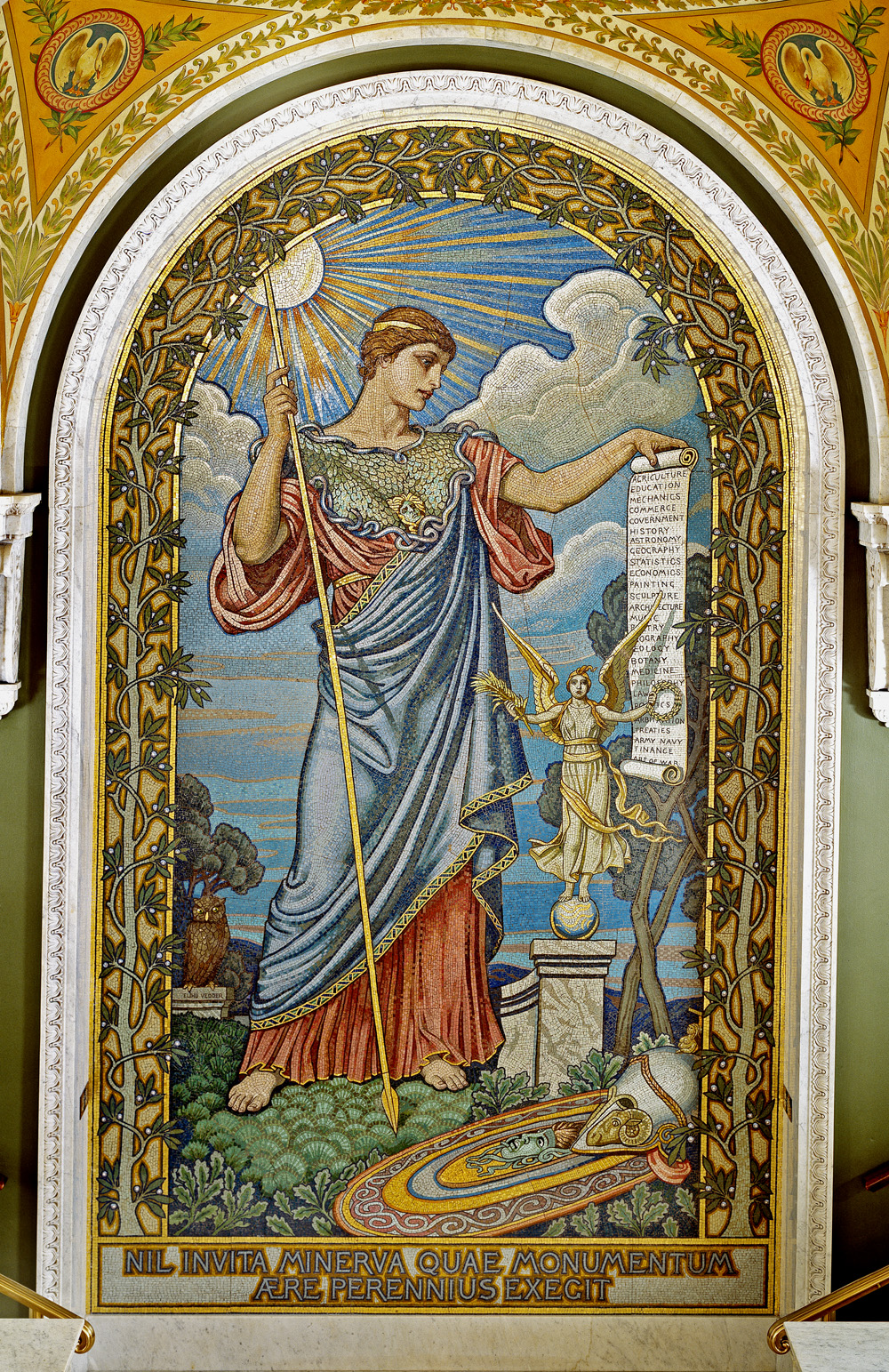
Minerva of Peace, mosaic by Elihu Vedder in the library's main building

Under Billington, public spaces of the Jefferson Building were enlarged and technologically enhanced to serve as a national exhibition venue. It has hosted more than 100 exhibitions. These included exhibits on the Vatican Library and the Bibliothèque Nationale de France, several on the Civil War and Lincoln, on African-American culture, on Religion and the founding of the American Republic, the Early Americas (the Kislak Collection became a permanent display), on the global celebration commemorating the 800th anniversary of Magna Carta, and on early American printing, featuring the Rubenstein Bay Psalm Book.

Onsite access to the Library of Congress has been increased. Billington gained an underground connection between the new U.S. Capitol Visitors Center and the library in 2008 to increase both congressional usage and public tours of the library's Thomas Jefferson Building.

In 2001, the library began a mass deacidification program, to extend the lifespan of almost 4 million volumes and 12 million manuscript sheets. In 2002, a new storage facility was completed at Fort Meade, Maryland, where a collection of storage modules have preserved and made accessible more than 4 million items from the library's analog collections.

Billington established the Library Collections Security Oversight Committee in 1992 to improve protection of the collections, and also the Library of Congress Congressional Caucus in 2008 to draw attention to the library's curators and collections. He created the library's first Young Readers Center in the Jefferson Building in 2009, and the first large-scale summer intern (Junior Fellows) program for university students in 1991.

Under Billington, the library sponsored the Gateway to Knowledge in 2010 to 2011, a mobile exhibition to ninety sites, covering all states east of the Mississippi, in a specially designed eighteen-wheel truck. This increased public access to library collections off-site, particularly for rural populations, and helped raise awareness of what was also available online.

Billington raised more than half a billion dollars of private support to supplement Congressional appropriations for library collections, programs, and digital outreach. These private funds helped the library to continue its growth and outreach in the face of a 30% decrease in staffing, caused mainly by legislative appropriations cutbacks. He created the library's first development office for private fundraising in 1987. In 1990, he established the James Madison Council, the library's first national private sector donor-support group. In 1987, Billington also asked the Government Accountability Office (GAO) to conduct the first library-wide audit. He created the first Office of the Inspector General at the library to provide regular, independent reviews of library operations. This precedent has resulted in regular annual financial audits at the library; it has received unmodified ("clean") opinions from 1995 onward. In April 2010, the library announced plans to archive all public communication on Twitter, including all communication since Twitter's launch in March 2006. As of 2015, the Twitter archive remains unfinished.

Before retiring in 2015, after 28 years of service, Billington had come "under pressure" as librarian of Congress. This followed a GAO report that described a "work environment lacking central oversight" and faulted Billington for "ignoring repeated calls to hire a chief information officer, as required by law."

When Billington announced his plans to retire in 2015, commentator George Weigel described the Library of Congress as "one of the last refuges in Washington of serious bipartisanship and calm, considered conversation", and "one of the world's greatest cultural centers".

=== 2016–2025: Hayden leadership ===
Appointed in 2016 by President Barack Obama, Carla D. Hayden was sworn in as the fourteenth librarian of Congress on September 14, 2016. She is the first professional librarian to hold the post since 1974, holding a Ph.D. in library science from the University of Chicago. She was the CEO of Enoch Pratt Free Library in Baltimore, Maryland, from 1993 until 2016, and president of the American Library Association (ALA) from 2003 to 2004. She also is the first woman and the first African American to hold the position. She continued the work of digitizing as much as possible of the collection and of expanding electronic access to the collection. She initiated programs to modernize the library, expand access from rural areas, and expanding the infrastructure and technological capacity of the library and assessment of her leadership of the library by the community reflects her expressed goals. The Association of Research Libraries noted Hayden's transformation of the library "into a more open, accessible, and celebrated U.S. institution, while reaffirming its role as the people’s library". The American Library Association characterized Hayden as a "wise and faithful steward of the Library of Congress – the library she has called our 'national treasure'".

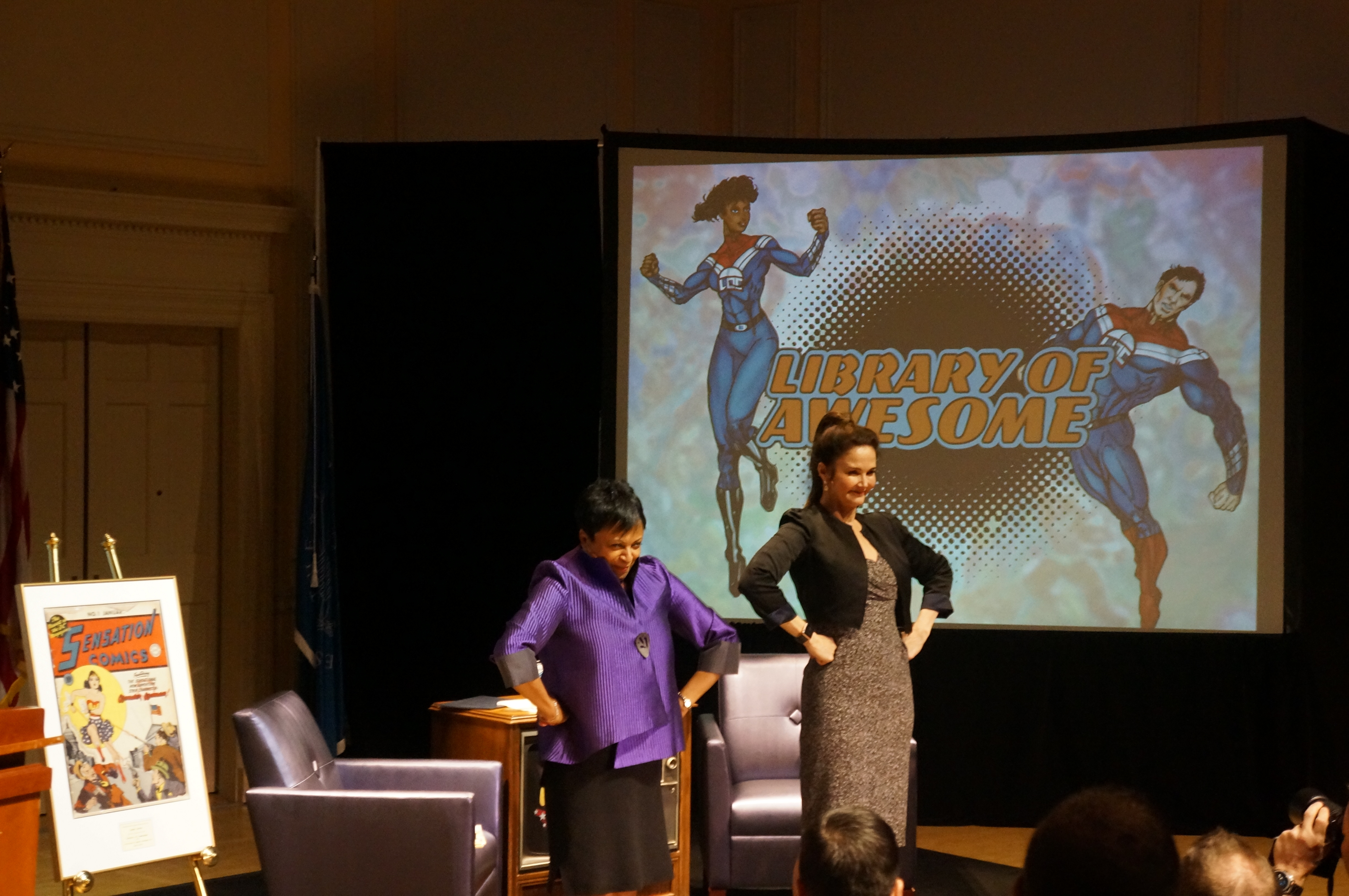
Librarian Carla Hayden (left) and Lynda Carter participating in the June 2017 "Library of Awesome" event at the United States Library of Congress that celebrated the role of comics and graphic novels in promoting literacy, as they strike the typical pose of Wonder Woman

In 2017, Hayden announced the Librarian-in-Residence program, which aims to support the future generation of librarians by giving them the opportunity to gain work experience in five different areas of librarianship, including: Acquisitions/Collection Development, Cataloging/Metadata, and Collection Preservation.

On January 6, 2021, at 1:11 pm EST, the Library's Madison Building and the Cannon House Office Building were the first buildings in the Capitol Complex to be ordered to evacuate as rioters breached security perimeters before storming the Capitol building. Hayden clarified two days later that rioters did not breach any of the Library buildings or collections and all staff members were safely evacuated.

On February 14, 2023, Hayden announced that the Lilly Endowment gifted the library with $2.5 million as a five-year grant to "launch programs that foster greater understanding of religious cultures in Africa, Central Asia, and the Middle East". The Library plans to leverage the donation in these areas:

- Produce a book and a film about Omar ibn Said
- Provide public access to "programs that enhance knowledge about faiths practiced in the regions, including Indigenous African religious traditions, Judaism, Christianity, Islam, and their influence on daily life."

On May 8, 2025, two days after Hayden had given testimony to the Senate Committee on Appropriations and the Committee on House Administration, via email and without any explanation, she was abruptly fired by President Trump. Publishers Weekly characterized Hayden's termination as the "latest blow to professional research and the literary and arts community."

No replacement of Hayden has been nominated. Principal Deputy Librarian Robert Newlen, who would have served as interim librarian was fired and Trump named Deputy Attorney General Todd Blanche as acting librarian of Congress and later fired the deputy librarian and copyright office director (Perlmutter and Newlen), appointing senior DOJ officials Brian Nieves and Paul Perkins as respectively, for the interim. This has been interpreted as an attack on the separation of powers. Perlmutter has sued to dispute the legality of the dismissal, as the register is appointed by, and responsible to, the librarian of Congress.

== Holdings ==
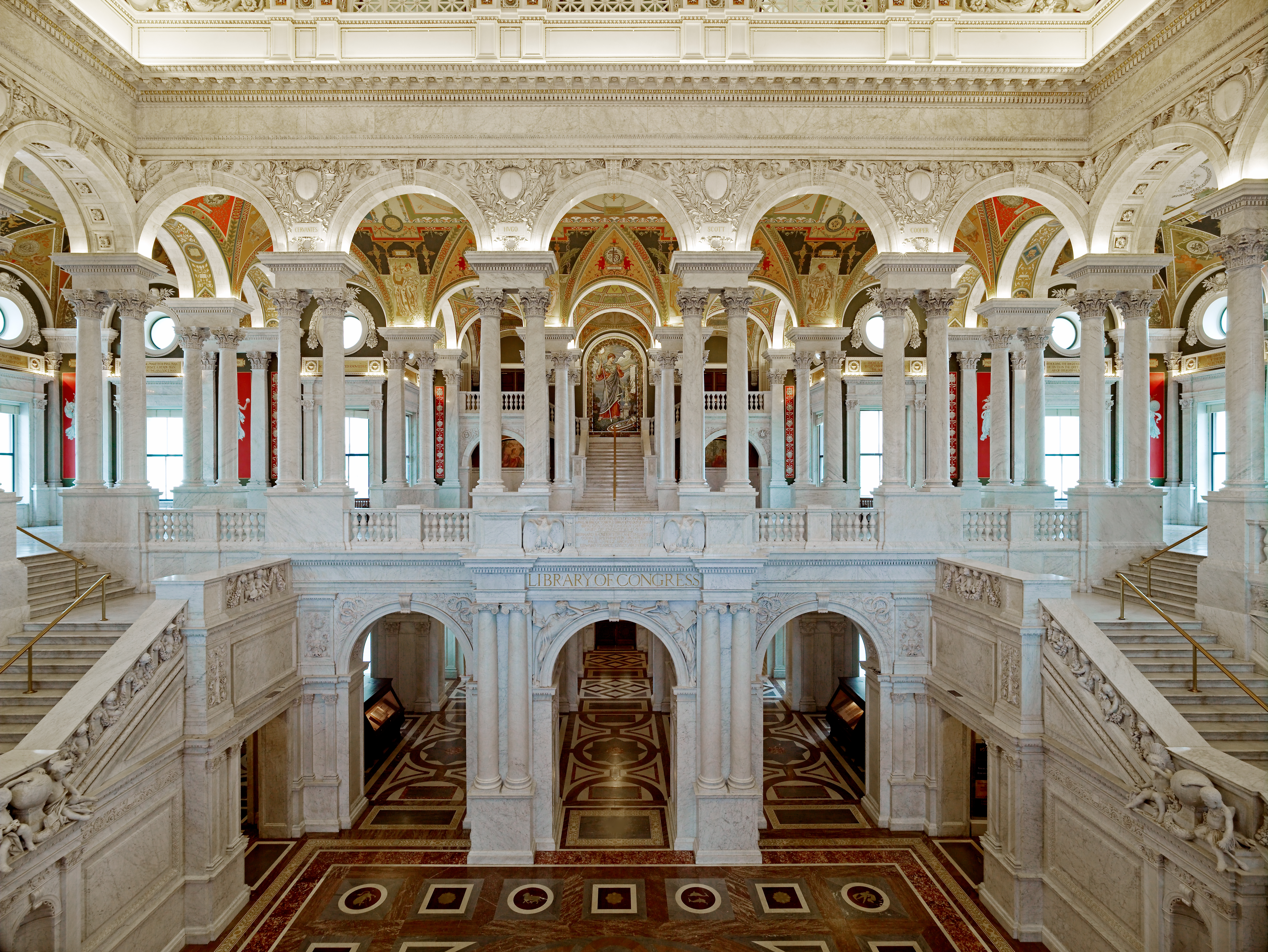
The extravagant design of the Great Hall is an example of Beaux-Arts architecture.

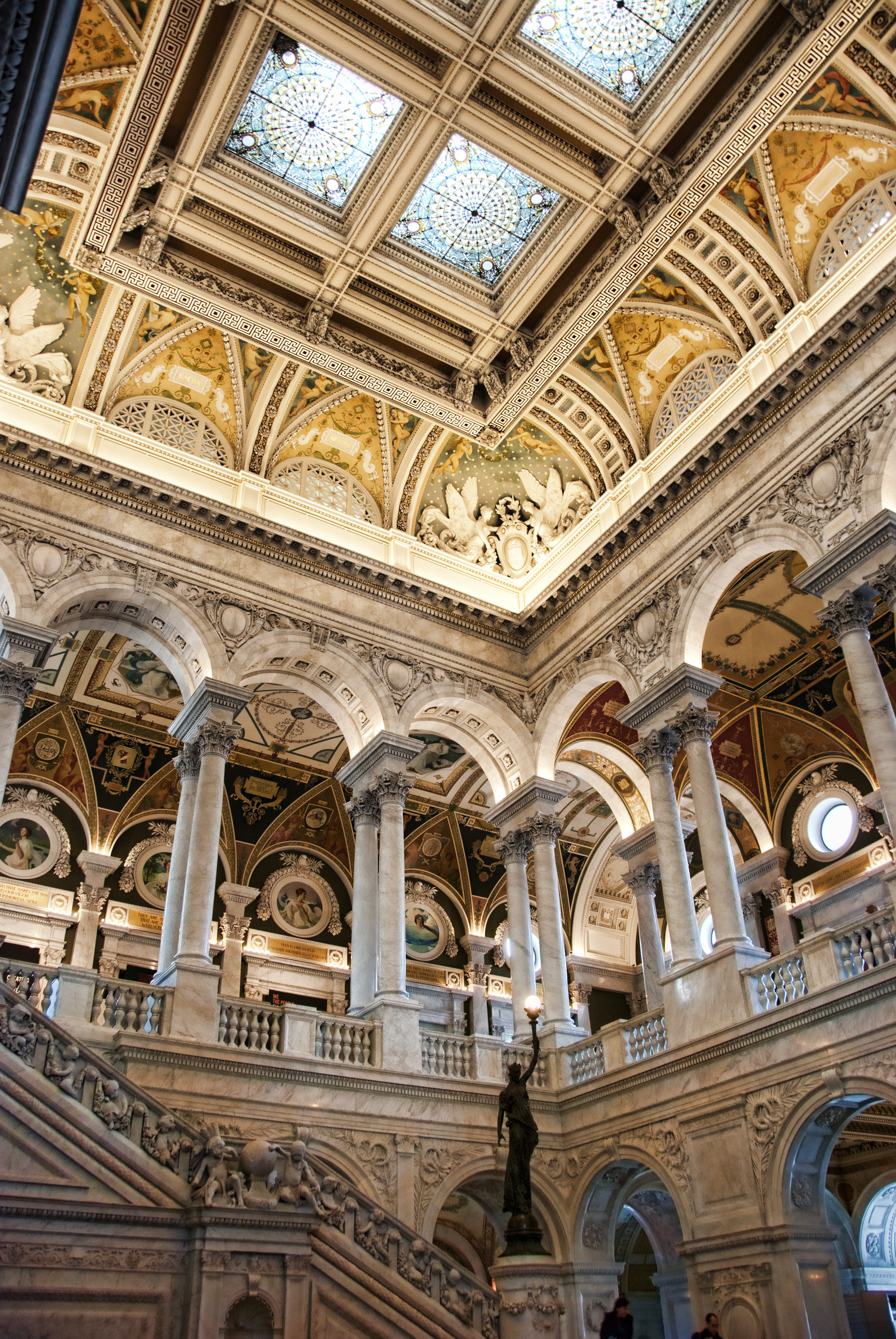
The Great Hall interior, looking toward the ceiling

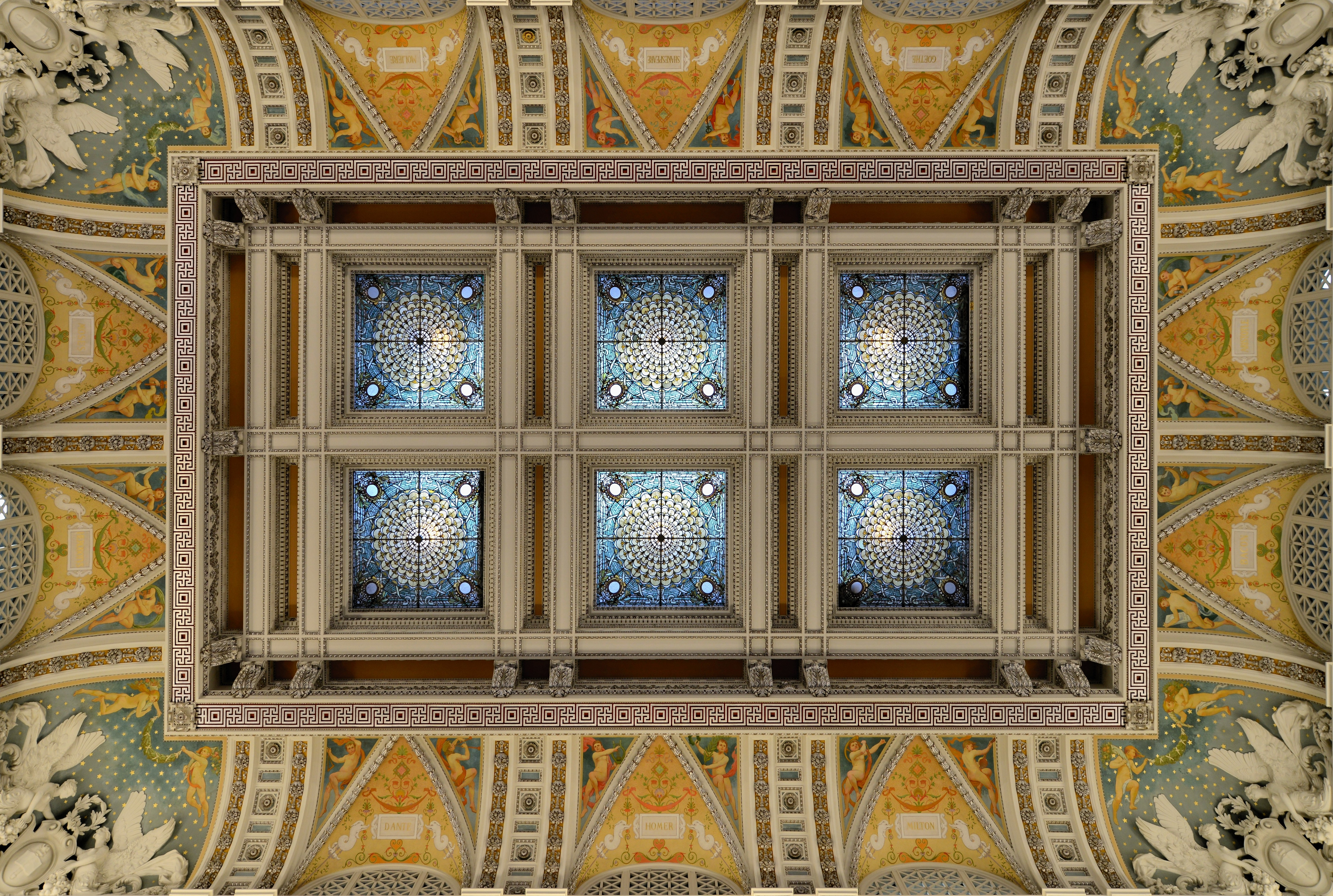
Ceiling of the Great Hall

The collections of the Library of Congress include more than 32 million catalogued books and other print materials in 470 languages; more than 61 million manuscripts; the largest rare book collection in North America, including the rough draft of the Declaration of Independence, a Gutenberg Bible (originating from the Saint Blaise Abbey, Black Forest—one of only three perfect vellum copies known to exist); over 1 million U.S. government publications; 1 million issues of world newspapers spanning the past three centuries; 33,000 bound newspaper volumes; 500,000 microfilm reels; U.S. and foreign comic books—over 12,000 titles in all, totaling more than 140,000 issues; 1.9 million moving images (as of 2020); 5.3 million maps; 6 million works of sheet music; 3 million sound recordings; more than 14.7 million prints and photographic images including fine and popular art pieces and architectural drawings; the Betts Stradivarius; and the Cassavetti Stradivarius.

The library developed a system of book classification called Library of Congress Classification (LCC), which is used by most U.S. research and university libraries.

The library serves as a legal repository for copyright protection and copyright registration, and as the base for the United States Copyright Office. Regardless of whether they register their copyright, all publishers are required to submit two complete copies of their published works to the library—this requirement is known as mandatory deposit. Nearly 15,000 new items published in the U.S. arrive every business day at the library. Contrary to popular belief, however, the library does not retain all of these works in its permanent collection, although it does add an average of 12,000 items per day. Rejected items are used in trades with other libraries around the world, distributed to federal agencies, or donated to schools, communities, and other organizations within the United States.

The legal requirement of mandatory deposit was challenged in Valancourt Books v. Garland, with the court finding that requiring a publisher to deposit copies of its books at the Library of Congress was a violation of the Takings Clause.

As is true of many similar libraries, the Library of Congress retains copies of every publication in the English language that is deemed significant. The Library of Congress states that its collection fills about 838 mi (1,349 km) of bookshelves and holds more than 167 million items with over 39 million books and other print materials. A 2000 study by information scientists Peter Lyman and Hal Varian suggested that the amount of uncompressed textual data represented by the 26 million books then in the collection was 10 terabytes.

The library also administers the National Library Service for the Blind and Physically Handicapped, an audio book and braille library program provided to more than 766,000 Americans.

=== Digital ===
The library's first digitization project, American Memory, was launched in 1990, and was initially planned to choose 160 million objects from its collection to make digitally available on LaserDiscs and CDs, which were distributed to schools and libraries.

After realizing that this plan would be too expensive and inefficient, and with the rise of the Internet, the library decided to instead make digitized material available over the Internet. This project was made official in the National Digital Library Program (NDLP), created in October 1994. By 1999, the NDLP had succeeded in digitizing over 5 million objects and had a budget of $12 million. As of 2022, the library's website contains 914 million unique digital objects, comprising over 21 petabytes of data.

American Memory is a source for public domain image resources, as well as audio, video, and archived Web content.

Nearly all of the lists of holdings, the catalogs of the library, can be consulted directly on its website. Librarians all over the world consult these catalogs, through the Web or through other media better suited to their needs, when they need to catalog for their collection a book published in the United States. They use the Library of Congress Control Number to make sure of the exact identity of the book.

Digital images are also available at Snapshots of the Past, which provides archival prints. The library has a budget of $6–8 million each year for digitization, meaning that not all works can be digitized. It makes determinations about what objects to prioritize based on what is especially important to Congress or potentially interesting for the public. The 15 million digitized items represent less than 10% of the library's total 160-million-item collection.

The library has chosen not to participate in other digital library projects such as Google Books and the Digital Public Library of America, although it has supported the Internet Archive project.

=== Congressional ===
In 1995, the Library of Congress established THOMAS, an online archive of the proceedings of the United States Congress, which included the full text of proposed legislation, bill summaries, and statuses, Congressional Record text, and an index of the Congressional Record. In 2005 and again in 2010, the THOMAS system received major updates. A migration to a more modernized Web system, Congress.gov, began in 2012, and the THOMAS system was retired in 2016. Congress.gov is a joint project of the Library of Congress, the House, the Senate, and the Government Publishing Office.

== Buildings ==
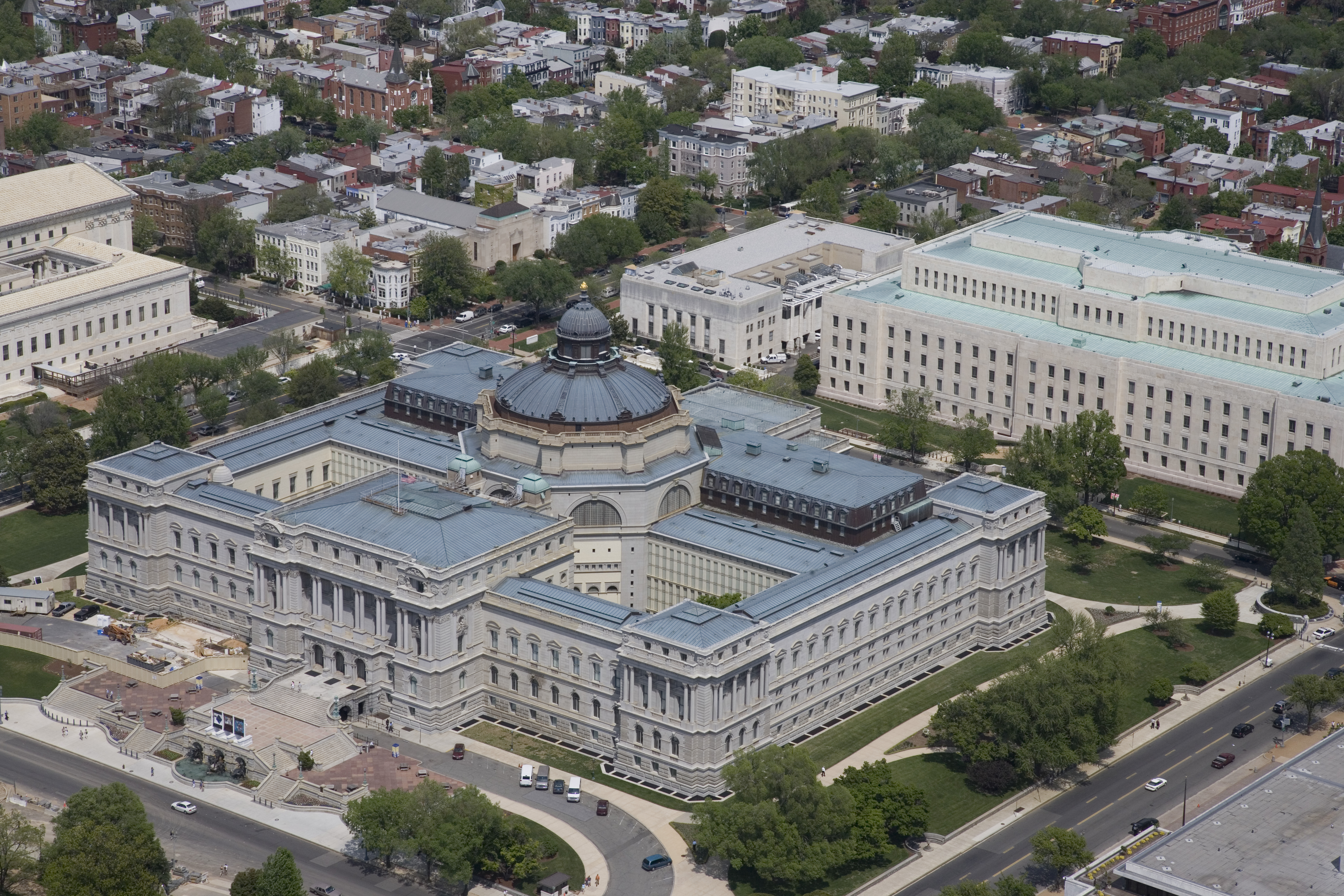
The Thomas Jefferson Building and part of the Adams Building (on the upper right) next to the Supreme Court Building (upper left) on Capitol Hill

The Library of Congress is physically housed in three buildings on Capitol Hill and a conservation center in rural Virginia. The library's Capitol Hill buildings are all connected by underground passageways, so that a library user need pass through security only once in a single visit. The library also has off-site storage facilities in Maryland for less commonly requested materials.

=== Thomas Jefferson Building ===
The Thomas Jefferson Building is located between Independence Avenue and East Capitol Street on First Street SE. Construction began in 1890 with granite supplied by New England Granite Works, owned by James G. Batterson. The building opened in 1897 as the main building of the library and is the oldest of the three buildings. Known originally as the Library of Congress Building or Main Building, it took its present name on June 13, 1980.

=== John Adams Building ===
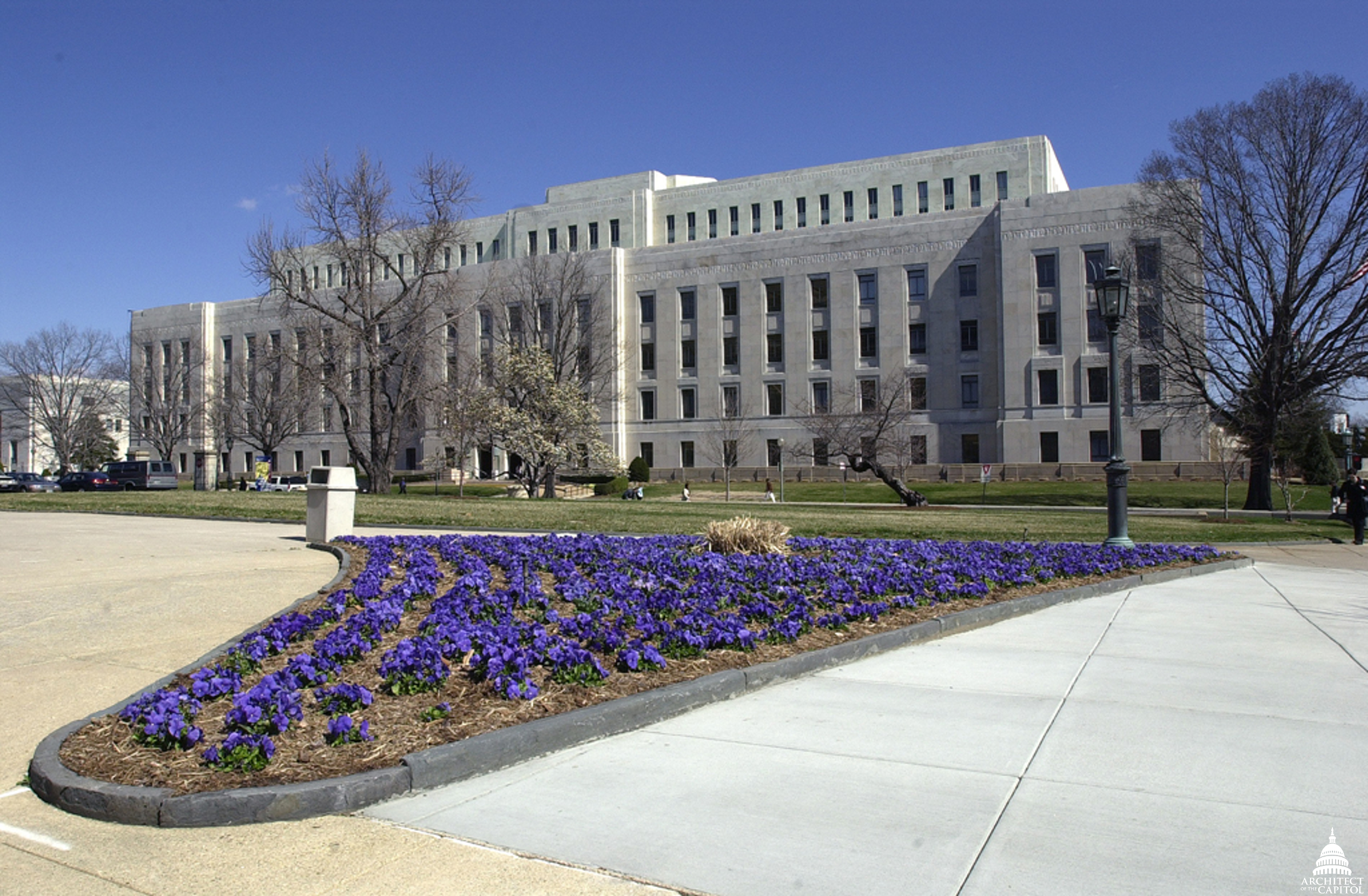
The John Adams Building

The John Adams Building is located between Independence Avenue and East Capitol Street on 2nd Street SE, the block adjacent to the Jefferson Building. The building was originally known as The Annex to the Main Building, which had run out of space. It opened its doors to the public on January 3, 1939. Initially, it also housed the U.S. Copyright Office which moved to the Madison building in the 1970s.

=== James Madison Memorial Building ===
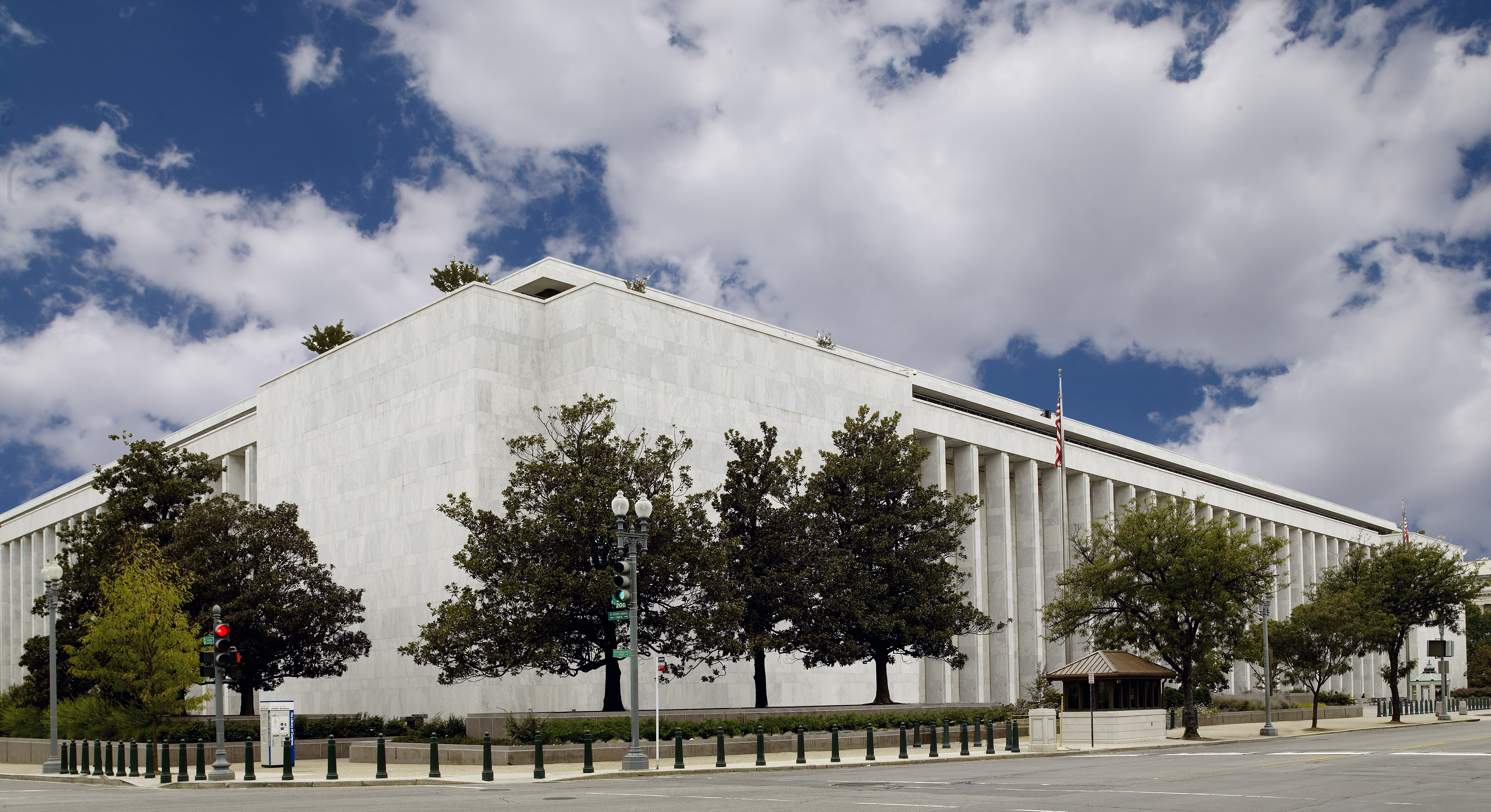
The James Madison Memorial Building

The James Madison Memorial Building is located between First and Second Streets on Independence Avenue SE. The building was constructed from 1971 to 1976, and serves as the official memorial to James Madison, a Founding Father and the fourth President of the United States.

The Madison Building is also home to the United States Copyright Office and to the Mary Pickford Theater, the "motion picture and television reading room" of the Library of Congress. The theater hosts regular free screenings of classic and contemporary movies and television shows.

=== Packard Campus for Audio-Visual Conservation ===
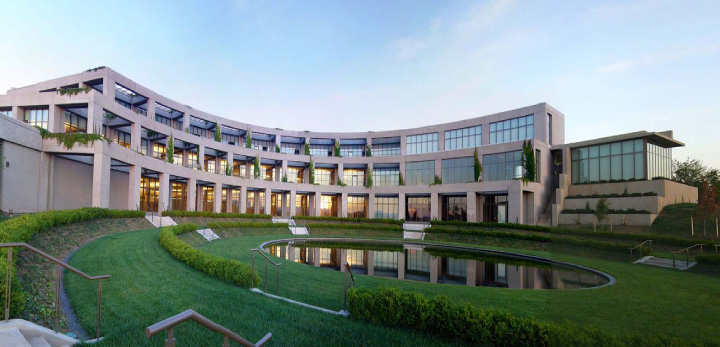
The National Audio-Visual Conservation Center in Culpeper, Virginia

Founded in 2007 and located in Culpeper, Virginia in Northern Virginia, the National Audio-Visual Conservation Center is the Library of Congress's newest building. It was constructed out of a former Federal Reserve storage center and Cold War bunker. The campus is designed to act as a single site to store all of the library's movie, television, and sound collections. It is named in honor of David Woodley Packard, whose Packard Humanities Institute oversaw the design and construction of the facility. The centerpiece of the complex is a reproduction Art Deco movie theater that presents free movie screenings to the public on a semi-weekly basis.

== Copyright Act ==
The Library of Congress, through both the librarian of Congress and the register of copyrights, is responsible for authorizing exceptions to Section 1201 of Title 17 of the United States Code as part of the Digital Millennium Copyright Act. This process is done every three years, with the register receiving proposals from the public and acting as an advisor to the librarian, who issues a ruling on what is exempt. After three years have passed, the ruling is no longer valid and a new ruling on exemptions must be made.

== Access ==
The library is open for academic research to anyone with a Reader Identification Card. One may not remove library items from the reading rooms or the library buildings. Most of the library's general collection of books and journals are in the closed stacks of the Jefferson and Adams Buildings; specialized collections of books and other materials are in closed stacks in all three main library buildings, or are stored off-site. Access to the closed stacks is not permitted under any circumstances, except to authorized library staff, and occasionally, to dignitaries. Only the reading room reference collections are on open shelves.

Since 1902, American libraries have been able to request books and other items through interlibrary loan from the Library of Congress if these items are not readily available elsewhere. Through this system, the Library of Congress has served as a "library of last resort", according to Herbert Putnam, the librarian of Congress from 1899 to 1939. The Library of Congress lends books to other libraries with the stipulation that they be used only inside the borrowing library. In 2017, the Library of Congress began development on a reader's card for children under the age of sixteen.

== Standards ==
In addition to its library services, the Library of Congress is actively involved in various standard activities in areas related to bibliographical and search and retrieval standards. Areas of work include MARC standards, Metadata Encoding and Transmission Standard (METS), Metadata Object Description Schema (MODS), Z39.50 and Search/Retrieve Web Service (SRW), and Search/Retrieve via URL (SRU). The Law Library of Congress "seeks to further legal scholarship by providing opportunities for scholars and practitioners to conduct significant legal research. Individuals are invited to apply for projects which would further the multi-faceted mission of the law library in serving the U.S. Congress, other governmental agencies, and the public."

== Annual events ==
- Fellows in American Letters of the Library of Congress
- Gershwin Prize for Popular Song
- Library of Congress Prize for American Fiction
- Founder's Day Celebration
- Mostly Lost Film Identification Workshop
- National Book Festival

== Notable personnel ==
- Henriette Avram: Developed the MARC format (Machine Readable Cataloging), the international data standard for bibliographic and holdings information in libraries.
- John Y. Cole: founder of the Center for the Book and first historian of the Library of Congress.
- Cecil Hobbs: American scholar of Southeast Asian history, head of the Southern Asia Section of the Orientalia (now Asian) Division of the Library of Congress, and a major contributor to scholarship on Asia and the development of South East Asian coverage in American library collections.
- Julius C. Jefferson Jr., head of the Congressional Research Service, president of the American Library Association (2020–2021), president of the Freedom to Read Foundation (2013–2016).

== Today ==
The Library of Congress continues to host exhibitions, educational programs, and online resources, making its collections accessible to researchers and the public worldwide.

== See also ==
- Architecture of Washington, D.C.
- Documents Expediting Project
- Federal Research Division
- Feleky Collection
- Law Library of Congress
- Library of Congress Classification
- Library of Congress Country Studies
- Library of Congress Living Legend
- Library of Congress Subject Headings
- Minerva Initiative
- National Digital Library Program (NDLP)
- National Film Registry
- National Recording Registry
- National Archives and Records Administration
- United States Senate Library
