= Philip Levis =

Scientist

- Education: Brown University; University of Colorado Boulder; University of California, Berkeley
- Known for: nesC
- Scientific career
- Workplaces: Stanford University
- Thesis: Application Specific Virtual Machines: Operating System Support for User-level Sensornet Programming (2005)
- Doctoral advisor: David Culler

Philip Alexander Levis is an American computer scientist. He is a professor of Computer Science and Electrical Engineering at Stanford University.

== Background ==
Levis received a Bachelor of Science in Biology and Computer Science from Brown University in 1999. He earned a Master of Science from the University of Colorado Boulder and a Ph.D. in from the University of California, Berkeley.
