= David Culler =

American computer scientist

David E. Culler
- Born: November 12, 1959 (age 66)
- Citizenship: USA
- Education: University of California, Berkeley; Massachusetts Institute of Technology
- Scientific career
- Fields: operating systems sensor networks High-performance computing
- Workplaces: University of California, Berkeley
- Thesis: Managing parallelism and resources in scientific dataflow programs (1989)
- Doctoral advisor: Arvind
- Notable students: Matt Welsh, Philip Levis, Seth Goldstein, Thorsten von Eicken, Andrea Arpaci-Dusseau

David Ethan Culler (born November 12, 1959) is a computer scientist and former chair of the Department of Electrical Engineering and Computer Sciences at the University of California, Berkeley. He is a principal investigator in the Software Defined Buildings (SDB) project at the EECS Department at Berkeley and the faculty director of the i4Energy Center. His research addresses networks of small, embedded wireless devices, planetary-scale internet services, parallel computer architecture, parallel programming languages, and high performance communication. This includes TinyOS, Berkeley Motes, PlanetLab, Networks of Workstations (NOW), Internet services, Active Message, Split-C, and the Threaded Abstract Machine (TAM).

Culler earned his B.A. at UC Berkeley and his Ph.D. at MIT.

Culler was elected a member of the National Academy of Engineering in 2005 for contributions to scalable parallel processing systems, including architectures, operating systems, and programming environments. He is also a Fellow of both ACM and IEEE. In 2003 his work on networks of wireless sensors earned him a place on Scientific American's annual list of top 50 innovators and Technology Review's “10 Emerging Technologies That Will Change the World.” More recently, he has received the 2013 SIGCOMM Test of Time Award for PlanetLab, and the 2013 Okawa Prize.

Culler founded Arch Rock, a company that makes wireless networked sensors. He recently joined Google as a distinguished engineer.

David Culler is the son of noted computer scientist Glen Culler, and the brother of distinguished pure mathematician Marc Culler.
