= Snapshots of the Past =

Snapshots of the Past is an archive and blog founded in May 2001 by Jim Lantos. The online archive contains Library of Congress images publicly available as museum-quality, fine art reproductions. The blog and social media channels feature images and original research and content about historic people, places, and events.

Lantos collaborated with Applewood Books on a series of books that collected images of themes ranging from Boston baseball, to vintage holidays and the lives of presidents.
