= Globule (CDN) =

Discontinued content delivery network

Globule logo

Globule was an open-source collaborative content delivery network developed at the Vrije Universiteit in Amsterdam since 2006. It is implemented as a third-party module for the Apache HTTP Server that allows any given server to replicate its documents to other Globule servers. This can improve the site's performance, maintain the site available to its clients even if some servers are down, and to a certain extent help to resist to flash crowds and the Slashdot effect. As of February 2011, the project is discontinued and is no longer maintained.

Globule takes care of maintaining consistency between the replicas, monitoring the servers, and automatically redirecting clients to one of the available replicas. Globule also supports the replication of PHP documents accessing MySQL databases. It runs on Unix and Windows systems.

== See also ==
- Codeen
