= Documents Expediting Project =

DOCEX, the common name for Documents Expediting Project, was a program begun in 1946 by the Library of Congress (LoC) to distribute duplicate copies of government publications they received from federal government agencies. The program provided a means of obtaining documents that were not distributed through the Federal Depository Library Program, not for sale by the Government Printing Office, and not available directly from the publishing agency. Initially, DOCEX was begun by the Librarian of Congress to make formerly classified documents available after World War II. Libraries could subscribe to the service and make selections from lists sent by LoC. LoC had a special arrangement with the Central Intelligence Agency (CIA) to distribute CIA reference aids, which consist of things such as posters of communist leaders of various countries.

The service was discontinued on September 30, 2004. A letter from Michael W. Albin explained that the decision to end DOCEX was a result of the service no longer being self-supporting because so many documents were available on the web and because several CIA titles had been discontinued.
