= RIPE Atlas =

RIPE Atlas is a global, open, distributed Internet measurement platform, consisting of thousands of measurement devices that measure Internet connectivity in real time.

== History ==
RIPE Atlas was established in 2010 by the RIPE Network Coordination Centre. As of April 2022, it was composed of around 12,000 probes and more than 800 anchors around the world.

== Technical details ==
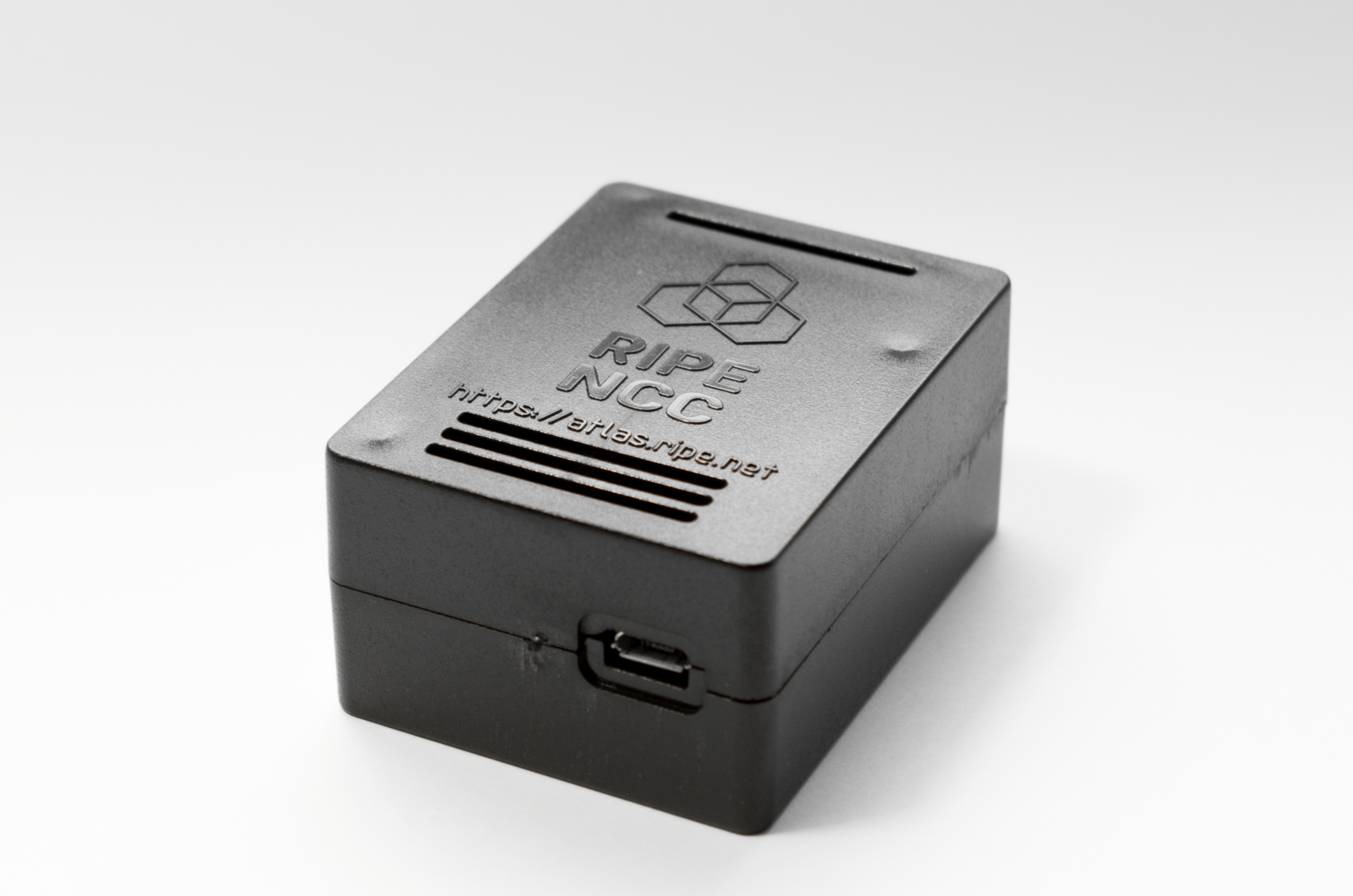
RIPE Atlas probe (version 4)

- Measurement types: The measurement devices (probes and anchors) perform IPv4 and IPv6 traceroute, ping, DNS, NTP and other measurements.
- Atlas Probe device types:
  - Versions 1 and 2 of the probe: Lantronix XPort Pro
  - Version 3 probe: modified TP-Link wireless router (model TL-MR 3020)
  - Version 4 probe: NanoPi NEO Plus2 single-board computer
  - Version 5 probe: custom design, derived from Turris Mox, developed by CZ.NIC
- Atlas Anchor device types
  - Version 2: Soekris Net6501-70 board in the 1U 19-inch rack-mounted case with additional SSD
  - Version 3: PC Engines APU2C2/APU2C4 in a 1U 19-inch rack-mounted case with additional SSD
- Probes and Anchors can also be hosted in a virtual machine, which is beneficial for organizations with existing server infrastructure
- The back-end architecture was described in detail in the September 2015 edition of the Internet Protocol Journal

== Community ==
Anyone can volunteer to host a RIPE Atlas probe. Probes are free of charge, low maintenance, and can be plugged in behind a home router or in a data center.

Organisations that want additional RIPE Atlas measurements targeting their network can host a RIPE Atlas anchor.

Tools for visualizing and analyzing RIPE Atlas measurement data are used by network operators for troubleshooting and network monitoring.

Open source software tools, written by RIPE Atlas users, are available in the repository for community contributions on GitHub.

Several hundred individuals also support RIPE Atlas as "ambassadors" by promoting participation and distributing probes. Organizations also support RIPE Atlas as sponsors.

Multiple hackerspaces have installed RIPE Atlas probes and have their own project about displaying the probes presence.

== Research papers ==
All the data collected by RIPE Atlas is open data and is made publicly available to users and the wider Internet community.

- Luconi, Valerio; Vecchio, Alessio (April 2023). "Impact of the first months of war on routing and latency in Ukraine". Computer Networks. 224 109596. Elsevier. arXiv:2208.09202. doi:10.1016/j.comnet.2023.109596. Archived from the original on 2023-03-07.
- Candela, Massimo; Luconi, Valerio; Vecchio, Alessio (December 2021). "A worldwide study on the geographic locality of Internet routes". Computer Networks. 201 108555. Elsevier. arXiv:2307.08120. doi:10.1016/j.comnet.2021.108555. S2CID 239954817. Archived from the original on 2023-12-22.
- Phokeer, Amreesh; Chege, Kevin; Chavula, Josiah; Elmokashfi, Ahmed; Gueye, Assane (April 2021). "Measuring Internet Resilience in Africa" (PDF). Internet Society. Archived (PDF) from the original on 2021-05-18.
- Corneo, Lorenzo; Eder, Maximilian; Mohan, Nitinder; Zavodovski, Aleksandr; Bayhan, Suzan; Wong, Walter; Gunningberg, Per; Kangasharju, Jussi; Ott, Jörg (November 2020). "Surrounded by the Clouds" (PDF). The Web Conference (WWW) 2021. Archived (PDF) from the original on 2021-04-20.
- Mohan, Nitinder; Corneo, Lorenzo; Zavodovski, Aleksandr; Bayhan, Suzan; Wong, Walter; Kangasharju, Jussi (November 2020). "Pruning Edge Research with Latency Shears" (PDF). ACM Workshop on Hot Topics in Networks (HotNets) 2020. Archived (PDF) from the original on 2020-11-01.
- Viet Doan, Trinh; Tsareva, Irina; Bajpai, Vaibhav (November 2020). "Measuring DNS over TLS from the Edge: Adoption, Reliability, and Response Times" (PDF). Passive & Active Measurement (PAM) 2021. Archived (PDF) from the original on 2021-03-05.
- Bakhshaliyev, Khalid (December 2020). "Processing large-scale Internet topology data to model Autonomous System Networks" (PDF). Dissertation. Archived (PDF) from the original on 2021-08-26.
- He, Jia; Jiang, Weifan; Gürmeriçliler, Ege; Essig, Georgia; Gupta, Arpit; Calder, Matt; Giotsas, Vasileios; Cunha, Italo; Katz-Bassett, Ethan; Arnold, Todd (2020). "Poster: Footprint and Performance of Large Cloud Networks" (PDF). columbia.edu. Archived (PDF) from the original on 2022-07-08.
- Ramanathan, Sivaramakrishnan; Hossain, Anushah; Mirkovic, Jelena; Yu, Minlan; Afroz, Sadia (October 2020). "Quantifying the Impact of Blocklisting in the Age of Address Reuse". Proceedings of the ACM Internet Measurement Conference. pp. 360–369. doi:10.1145/3419394.3423657. ISBN 9781450381383. S2CID 222120978. Archived from the original on 2023-12-22.
- Candela, Massimo; Luconi, Valerio; Vecchio, Alessio (2020). "Impact of the COVID-19 pandemic on the Internet latency: A large-scale study". Computer Networks. 182 107495. Elsevier. arXiv:2005.06127. doi:10.1016/j.comnet.2020.107495. PMC 7439971. PMID 35023997. S2CID 218613864.
- Arnold, Todd; Gürmeriçliler, Ege; Essig, Georgia; Gupta, Arpit; Calder, Matt; Giotsas, Vasileios; Katz-Bassett, Ethan (6–9 July 2020). "(How Much) Does a Private WAN Improve Cloud Performance?" (PDF). IEEE INFOCOM 2020 - IEEE Conference on Computer Communications. pp. 79–88. doi:10.1109/INFOCOM41043.2020.9155428. ISBN 978-1-7281-6412-0. S2CID 213748477. Archived (PDF) from the original on 20 September 2020.
- Strowes, Stephen; Wilhelm, Rene; Obser, Florian; Stagni, Riccardo; Formoso, Agust; Aben, Emile (10 June 2020). "Debogonising 2a10::/12. Analysis of one week's visibility of a new /12" (PDF). International Federation for Information Processing. Archived (PDF) from the original on 11 May 2021.
- Fonseca, Osvaldo; Cunha, Ítalo; Fazzion, Elverton; Meira, Wagner; Junior, Brivaldo; Ferreira, Ronaldo; Katz-Bassett, Ethan (22–26 June 2020). "Tracking Down Sources of Spoofed IP Packets". IFIP Networking: 208–216. Archived from the original on 29 September 2020.
- Al-Dalky, Rami; Rabinovich, Michael (2020). "On the Performance of DNS Resolvers in the IPv6 and ECS Era" (PDF). Case Western Reserve University. Archived (PDF) from the original on 2020-09-24.
- Müller, Moritz; Thomas, Matthew; Wessels, Duane; Hardaker, Wes; Chung, Taejoong; Toorop, Willem; van Rijswijk-Deij, Roland (2019). "Roll, Roll, Roll your Root". Proceedings of the Internet Measurement Conference (PDF). pp. 1–14. doi:10.1145/3355369.3355570. ISBN 9781450369480. S2CID 204812115. Archived (PDF) from the original on 2023-10-16.
- Chavula, Josiah; Phokeer, Amreesh; Calandro, Enrico (22 March 2019). "Performance Barriers to Cloud Services in Africa's Public Sector: A Latency Perspective". E-Infrastructure and e-Services for Developing Countries. Lecture Notes of the Institute for Computer Sciences, Social Informatics and Telecommunications Engineering. Vol. 275. pp. 152–163. doi:10.1007/978-3-030-16042-5_15. ISBN 978-3-030-16041-8. S2CID 169836720.
- Foremski, Pawel; Gasser, Oliver; Moura, Giovane (21–23 October 2019). "DNS Observatory: The Big Picture of the DNS" (PDF). Proceedings of the Internet Measurement Conference. pp. 87–100. doi:10.1145/3355369.3355566. ISBN 978-1-4503-6948-0. S2CID 204812083. Archived (PDF) from the original on 24 October 2019.
- Moura, Giovane; Heidemann, John; De Schmidt, Ricardo; Hardaker, Wes (October 2019). "Cache Me if You Can: Effects of DNS Time-to-Live". Proceedings of the Internet Measurement Conference. pp. 101–115. doi:10.1145/3355369.3355568. ISBN 978-1-4503-6948-0. S2CID 197622020.
- Haq, Osama; Doucette, Cody; Byers, John; Dogar, Fahad (2019). "Judicious QoS using Cloud Overlays". arXiv:1906.02562 [cs.NI].
- Calandro, Enrico; Chavula, Josiah; Phokeer, Amreesh (22 March 2019). "Internet Development in Africa: A Content Use, Hosting and Distribution Perspective". E-Infrastructure and e-Services for Developing Countries. Lecture Notes of the Institute for Computer Sciences, Social Informatics and Telecommunications Engineering. Vol. 275. pp. 131–141. doi:10.1007/978-3-030-16042-5_13. ISBN 978-3-030-16041-8. S2CID 169471605.
- Iodice, Mattia; Candela, Massimo; Di Battista, Giuseppe (2019). "Periodic Path Changes in RIPE Atlas". IEEE Access. 7. IEEE: 65518–65526. Bibcode:2019IEEEA...765518I. doi:10.1109/ACCESS.2019.2917804.
- Candela, Massimo; Gregori, Enrico; Luconi, Valerio; Vecchio, Alessio (2019). "Using RIPE Atlas for Geolocating IP Infrastructure". IEEE Access. 7: 48816–48829. Bibcode:2019IEEEA...748816C. doi:10.1109/ACCESS.2019.2909691. hdl:11568/988353. S2CID 131778098.
- Candela, Massimo; Gregori, Enrico; Luconi, Valerio; Vecchio, Alessio (2019). "Dissecting the Speed-of-Internet of Middle East".
- Yasin Nur, Abdullah; Engin Tozal, Mehmet (2018). "Cross-AS (X-AS) Internet topology mapping". Computer Networks. 132: 53–67. doi:10.1016/j.comnet.2018.01.011.
- Lazar, David; Gilad, Yossi; Zeldovich, Nickolai (2018). "Karaoke: Distributed Private Messaging Immune to Passive Traffic Analysis" (PDF). MIT CSAIL. Archived (PDF) from the original on 2019-07-12.
- Candela, Massimo; Di Bartolomeo, Marco; Di Battista, Giuseppe; Squarcella, Claudio (2018). "Radian: Visual Exploration of Traceroutes". IEEE Transactions on Visualization and Computer Graphics. 24 (7): 2194–2208. Bibcode:2018ITVCG..24.2194C. doi:10.1109/TVCG.2017.2716937. hdl:11590/330144. PMID 28641263. S2CID 21071049.
- Weinberg, Zachary; Cho, Shinyoung; Christin, Nicolas; Sekar, Vyas; Gill, Phillipa (2018). "How to Catch when Proxies Lie: Verifying the Physical Locations of Network Proxies with Active Geolocation" (PDF). Proceedings of the Internet Measurement Conference 2018. pp. 203–217. doi:10.1145/3278532.3278551. ISBN 978-1-4503-5619-0. S2CID 52906913. Archived (PDF) from the original on 2018-10-31.
- Scheitle, Quirin; Hohlfeld, Oliver; Gamba, Julien; Jelten, Jonas; Zimmermann, Torsten; Strowes, Stephen; Vallina-Rodriguez, Narseo (2018). "A Long Way to the Top: Significance, Structure, and Stability of Internet Top Lists" (PDF). Proceedings of the Internet Measurement Conference 2018. pp. 478–493. arXiv:1805.11506. doi:10.1145/3278532.3278574. ISBN 978-1-4503-5619-0. S2CID 44061275. Archived (PDF) from the original on 2019-01-10.
- Khan, Mohammad Taha; de Blasio, Joe; Voelker, Geoffrey; Snoeren, Alex; Kanich, Chris; Vallina-Rodriguez, Narseo (2018). "An Empirical Analysis of the Commercial VPN Ecosystem" (PDF). Proceedings of the Internet Measurement Conference 2018. pp. 443–456. doi:10.1145/3278532.3278570. ISBN 9781450356190. S2CID 53228195. Archived (PDF) from the original on 2019-01-10.
- "Ensuring a Future for Detecting Internet Disruptions: A Field Survey of the Ecosystem Around Internet Censorship, Disruptions, and Shutdowns" (PDF). Open Technology Institute. June 2017. Archived (PDF) from the original on 2021-08-27.
- Gigis, P.; Kotronis, V.; Aben, E.; Strowes, S. D.; Dimitropoulos, X. (July 2017). "Characterizing User-to-User Connectivity with RIPE Atlas" (PDF). Proceedings of the Applied Networking Research Workshop. pp. 4–6. arXiv:1707.05038. doi:10.1145/3106328.3106332. ISBN 9781450351089. S2CID 19771796. Archived (PDF) from the original on 2017-09-14.
- Holterbach, T.; Aben, E.; Pelsser, C.; Bush, R.; Vanbeve, L. (July 2017). "Measurement Vantage Point Selection Using A Similarity Metric" (PDF). Proceedings of 2016 Applied Networking Research Workshop, Prague, Czech Republic. Archived (PDF) from the original on 2021-08-27.
- Shah, Anant; Fontugne, Romain; Aben, Emile; Pelsser, Cristel; Bush, Randy (2017). "Disco: Fast, good, and cheap outage detection". 2017 Network Traffic Measurement and Analysis Conference (TMA) (PDF). IFIP. pp. 1–9. doi:10.23919/TMA.2017.8002902. ISBN 978-3-901882-95-1. S2CID 7242136. Archived (PDF) from the original on 2021-08-26.
- Scheitle, Quirin; Gasser, Oliver; Sattler, Patrick; Carle, Georg (2017). "HLOC: Hints-Based Geolocation Leveraging Multiple Measurement Frameworks" (PDF). IEEE/IFIP TMA Conference 2017, Network Traffic Liaasurement and Analysis Conference, Dublin, Ireland. IEEE/IFIP: 9. arXiv:1706.09331. Archived (PDF) from the original on 2022-12-01.
- LI, Yue; Iannone, Luigi (2016). "Using RIPE atlas to evaluate the locator/Id Separation Protocol". 2016 IEEE Conference on Computer Communications Workshops (INFOCOM WKSHPS). IEEE. pp. 696–697. doi:10.1109/INFCOMW.2016.7562166. ISBN 978-1-4673-9955-5. S2CID 14816542.
- LI, Yue; Iannone, Luigi (2016). "Performance Evaluation of Locator/Identifier Separation Protocol through RIPE Atlas". Proceedings of the 2016 ACM SIGCOMM Conference (PDF). ACM. pp. 561–562. doi:10.1145/2934872.2959050. ISBN 978-1-4503-4193-6. S2CID 1636819. Archived (PDF) from the original on 2022-12-01.
- Cunha, I.; Marchetta, P.; Calder, M.; Chiu, Y.; Schlinker, B.; Machado, B.; Pescape, A.; Giotsas, V.; Madhyastha, H.; Katz-Bassett., E. (2016). "Sibyl: A Practical Internet Route Oracle" (PDF). USENIX Symposium on Networked Systems Design & Implementation (NSDI). Archived (PDF) from the original on 2017-06-27.
- Wassermann, S.; Casas, P.; Donnet, B.; Leduc, G.; Melia, M. (2016). "On the Analysis of Internet Paths with DisNETPerf, a Distributed Paths Performance Analyzer". 2016 IEEE 41st Conference on Local Computer Networks Workshops (LCN Workshops) (PDF). pp. 72–79. doi:10.1109/LCN.2016.031. hdl:2268/200967. ISBN 978-1-5090-2347-9. S2CID 17860465.
- Jones, Ben; Feamster, Nick; Paxson, Vern; Weaver, Nicholas; Allman, Mark (2016). "Detecting DNS Root Manipulation" (PDF). Passive and Active Measurement. Lecture Notes in Computer Science. Vol. 9631. pp. 276–288. doi:10.1007/978-3-319-30505-9_21. ISBN 978-3-319-30504-2. Archived (PDF) from the original on 2017-08-29.
- Fonseca, Osvaldo; Fazzion, Elverton; Cunha, Ítalo; Bragioni, Pedro; Guedes, Dorgival; Meira, Wagner; Hoepers, Cristine; Steding-Jessen, Klaus; Chaves, Marcelo (2016). "Measuring, Characterizing, and Avoiding Spam Traffic Costs". IEEE Internet Computing. 20 (4): 16–24. Bibcode:2016IIC....20d..16F. doi:10.1109/MIC.2016.53. S2CID 16405193.
- Bajpai, V.; Schonwalder, J. (2015). "A Survey on Internet Performance Measurement Platforms and Related Standardization Efforts". IEEE Communications Surveys & Tutorials. 17 (3): 1313–1341. doi:10.1109/COMST.2015.2418435. S2CID 7846757.
- Amin, Christopher; Candela, Massimo; Karrenberg, Daniel; Kisteleki, Robert; Strikos, Andreas (2015). "Visualization and Monitoring for the Identification and Analysis of DNS Issues". Proc. 10th International Conference on Internet Monitoring and Protection (ICIMP 2015), Brussels. ISBN 978-1-61208-413-8. Archived from the original on 2016-03-05.
- Anwar, Ruwaifa; Niaz, Haseeb; Choffnes, David; Cunha, Ítalo; Gill, Phillipa; Katz-Bassett, Ethan (October 2015). "Investigating Interdomain Routing Policies in the Wild" (PDF). Proceedings of the 2015 Internet Measurement Conference. p. 71. doi:10.1145/2815675.2815712. ISBN 9781450338486. S2CID 10955615. Archived (PDF) from the original on 2016-04-30.
- Giotsas, Vasileios; Smaragdakis, Georgios; Huffaker, Bradley; Luckie, Matthew; kc, claffy (2015). "Mapping peering interconnections to a facility" (PDF). Proceedings of the 11th ACM Conference on Emerging Networking Experiments and Technologies. ACM. pp. 1–13. doi:10.1145/2716281.2836122. ISBN 978-1-4503-3412-9. S2CID 15195420. Archived (PDF) from the original on 2021-10-04.
- Bajpai, Vaibhav; Eravuchira, Steffie Jacob; Schönwälder, Jürgen (2015-07-01). "Lessons Learned From Using the RIPE Atlas Platform for Measurement Research". ACM SIGCOMM Computer Communication Review. 45 (3): 35–42. doi:10.1145/2805789.2805796. ISSN 0146-4833. S2CID 15680865.
- Holterbach, Thomas; Pelsser, Cristel; Bush, Randy; Vanbever, Laurent (2015-01-01). "Quantifying Interference between Measurements on the RIPE Atlas Platform" (PDF). Proceedings of the 2015 Internet Measurement Conference. IMC '15. New York, NY, USA: ACM. pp. 437–443. doi:10.1145/2815675.2815710. ISBN 978-1-4503-3848-6. S2CID 13902723. Archived (PDF) from the original on 2019-06-19.
- Chiu, Y.; Schlinker, B.; Radhakrishnan, A. B.; Katz-Bassett, E.; Govindan, R. (2015). "Are We One Hop Away from a Better Internet?" (PDF). Proceedings of the 2015 Internet Measurement Conference. pp. 523–529. doi:10.1145/2815675.2815719. ISBN 978-1-4503-3848-6. Archived (PDF) from the original on 2017-06-27.
- Calder, M.; Flavel, A.; Katz-Bassett, E.; Mahajan, R.; Padhye, J. (2015). "Analyzing the Performance of an Anycast CDN" (PDF). Proceedings of the 2015 Internet Measurement Conference. pp. 531–537. doi:10.1145/2815675.2815717. ISBN 978-1-4503-3848-6. Archived (PDF) from the original on 2017-06-27.
- Anwar, R.; Niaz, H.; Choffnes, D.; Cunha, I.; Gill, P.; Katz-Bassett, E. (2015). "Investigating Interdomain Routing Policies in the Wild" (PDF). Proceedings of the 2015 Internet Measurement Conference. pp. 71–77. doi:10.1145/2815675.2815712. ISBN 978-1-4503-3848-6. Archived (PDF) from the original on 2016-04-30.
- Dissecting Last-mile Latency Characteristics
- Vantage Point Selection for IPv6 Measurements: Benefits and Limitations of RIPE Atlas Tags
- Anderson, Collin; Winter, Philipp (2014). "Global Network Interference Detection Over the RIPE Atlas Network". 4th USENIX Workshop on Free and Open Communications on the Internet (FOCI 14). USENIX. Archived from the original on 2024-05-20.
- Sukhov, A. M.; Kuznetsova, N. Yu.; Pervitsky, A. K.; Galtsev, A. A. (2010). "Generating Function For Network Delay". Journal of High Speed Networks. 22 (4): 321. arXiv:1003.0190. doi:10.3233/JHS-160552. S2CID 10873658.

== See also ==
- PlanetLab
- PerfSONAR
- OONI
