= CoDeeN =

Proxy server system

- Developer(s): Princeton University
- Initial release: 2003
- Operating system: Cross-platform (web-based application)
- Type: P2P Web cache
- Website: codeen.cs.princeton.edu

CoDeeN is a proxy server system created at Princeton University in 2003 and deployed for general use on PlanetLab. It operates as per the following:

1. Users set their internet caches to a nearby high bandwidth proxy that participates in the system.
2. Requests to that proxy are then forwarded to an appropriate member of the system that is in charge of the file (should be caching it) and that has sent recent updates showing that it is still alive. The file is forwarded to the proxy and thence to the client.

What this means for normal users is that if they use this and a server is slow, however the content is cached on the system, then (after the first upload) requests to that file will be fast. It also means that the request will not be satisfied by the original server, equivalent to free bandwidth.

For rare files this system could be slightly slower than downloading the file itself. The system's speed is also subject to the constraint of number of participating proxies.

For the case of large files requested by many peers, it uses a kind of 'multi-cast stream' from one peer to the others, which then distribute out to their respective proxies.

CoBlitz, a CDN technology firm (2006–2009), was a take-off of this, in that files are not saved in the web cache of a single member of the proxy-system, but are instead saved piece-wise across several members, and 'gathered up' when they are requested. This allows for more sharing of disk space among proxies, and for higher fault tolerance. To access this system, URLs were prefixed with http://coblitz.codeen.org/. Verivue Inc. acquired CoBlitz in October 2010.
