= National Digital Library Program =

American digital library

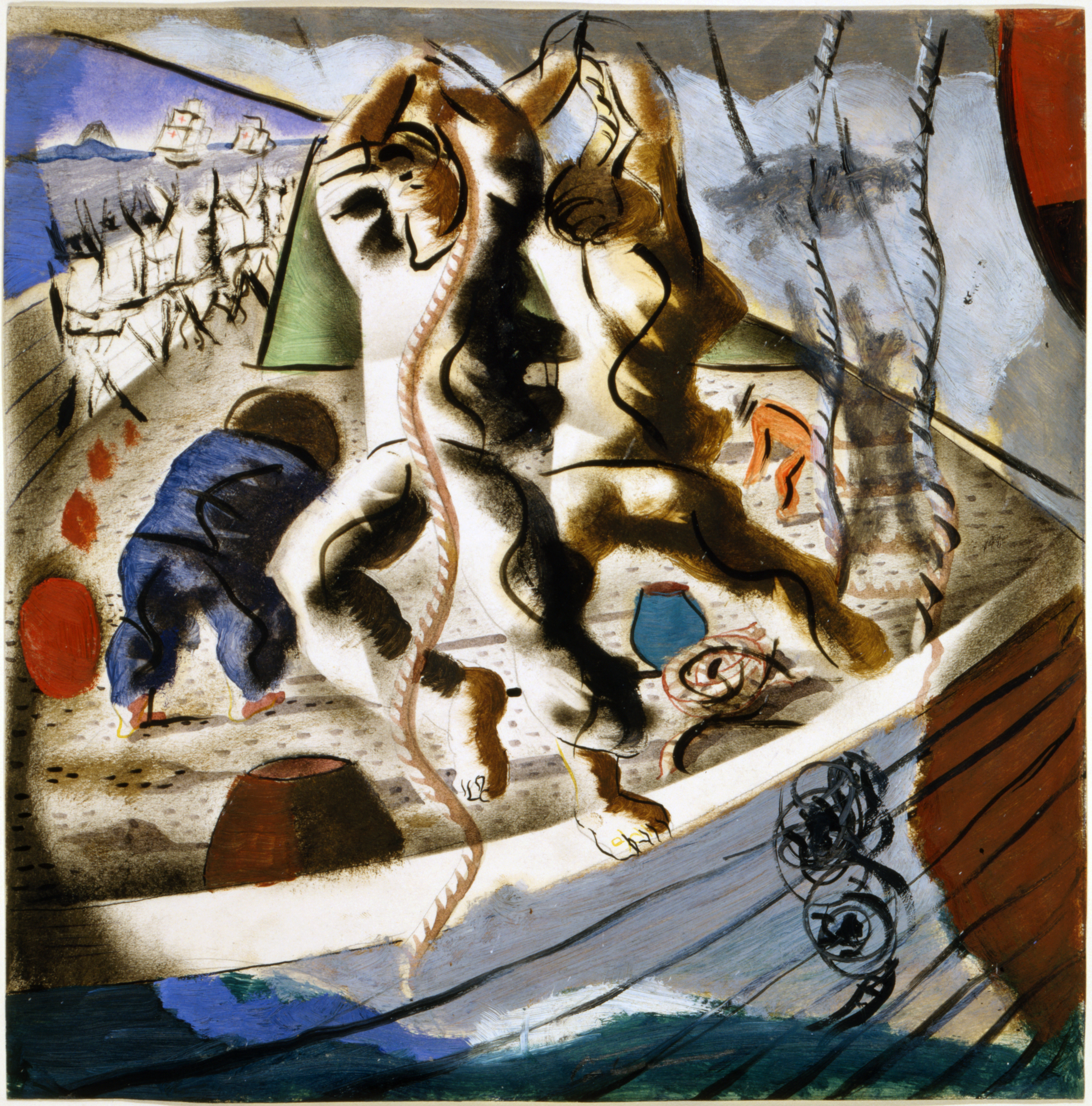
Study for Discovery of the Land, a mural at the Library of Congress Hispanic Division, by Candido Portinari.

The National Digital Library Program (NDLP) is a project by the United States Library of Congress to assemble a digital library of reproductions of primary source materials to support the study of the history and culture of the United States. The NDLP brought online 24 million books and documents from the Library of Congress and other research institutions.

== History ==
Begun in 1995 after a five-year pilot project, the program began digitizing selected collections of Library of Congress archival materials that chronicle the nation's history. In order to reproduce collections of books, pamphlets, motion pictures, manuscripts and sound recordings, the Library created a range of digital entities: bitonal document images, grayscale and color pictorial images, digital video and audio, and searchable e-texts. To provide access to the reproductions, the project developed a range of descriptive elements: bibliographic records, finding aids, and introductory texts and programs, as well as indexing the full texts for certain types of content.

The reproductions were produced with a variety of tools: image scanners, digital cameras, devices that digitize audio and video, and human labor for rekeying and encoding texts. American Memory employs national-standard and well established industry-standard formats for many digital reproductions, e.g., texts encoded with Standard Generalized Markup Language (SGML) and images stored in Tagged Image File Format (TIFF) files or compressed with the Joint Photographic Experts Group (JPEG) algorithm. In other cases, the lack of well established standards has led to the use of emerging formats, e.g., RealAudio (for audio), QuickTime (for moving images), and MrSID (for maps). Technical information by types of material and by individual collections is also available on the site.

The Library received funding from Congress and private sector donations, sponsoring a three-year competition to enable institutions like libraries to digitize their U.S. history collections.

== See also ==
- Digital curation
- Digital library
- Digital preservation
- List of digital library projects
