= PlanetLab =

Testbed for computer networking and distributed systems research

PlanetLab was a group of computers available as a testbed for computer networking and distributed systems research. It was established in 2002 by Prof. Larry L. Peterson and Prof. David Culler, and by 2005 it had been deployed at 252 sites in 28 countries. Each research project had a "slice", or virtual machine access to a subset of the nodes.

Accounts were limited to persons affiliated with corporations and universities that hosted PlanetLab nodes. However, a number of free, public services have been deployed on PlanetLab, including CoDeeN, the Coral Content Distribution Network, and Open DHT.

PlanetLab was officially shut down in May 2020 but continues in Europe.
