= Estrin =

Estrin is a surname. Notable people with the surname include:

- Allen Estrin (born 1954), American screenwriter and co-founder of PragerU
- Dan Estrin (born 1976), guitarist for Hoobastank
- Deborah Estrin, American computer scientist
- Gerald Estrin (1921–2012), American computer scientist
- Judith Estrin, American business executive
- Marc Estrin (born 1939) American writer and political activist
- Morton Estrin (1923–2017), American pianist
- Robert Estrin (born 1942), American film editor
- Thelma Estrin (1924–2014), American computer scientist and biomedical engineer
- Yakov Estrin (1923–1987), Russian chess player

It may also refer to:

- Estrin, a parent structure of the estrogen steroid hormones
