= Golem (computer) =

Early computers built at the Weizmann Institute of Science

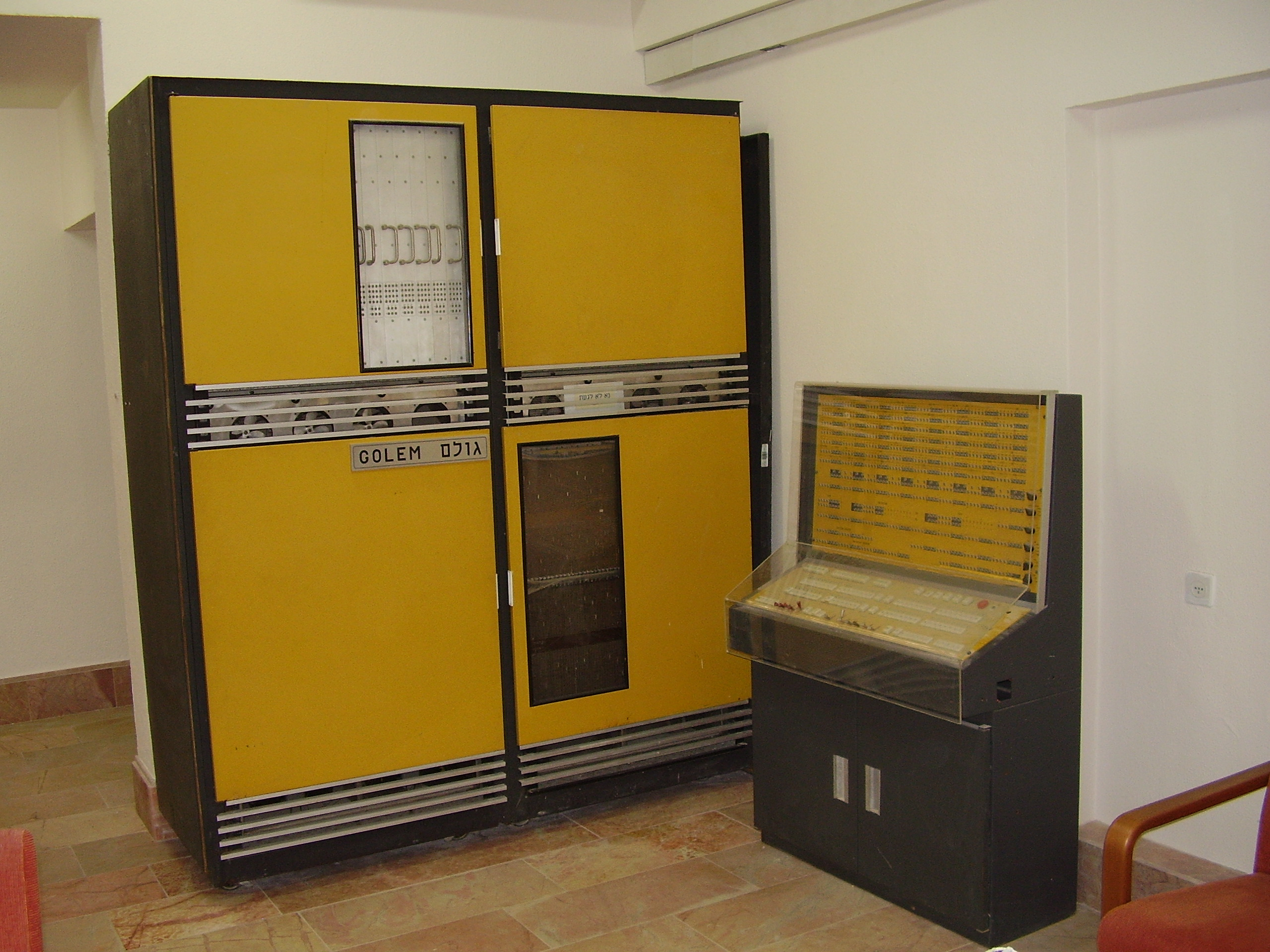
One of the Golem computers in the Ziskind Building at the Weizmann Institute of Science

Golem (גולם) was the name given to three computers built at the Weizmann Institute of Science and used for research at the institute and at other Israeli research centers. The project was led by Smil Ruhman, an American-Israeli computer scientist and electrical engineer who had earlier worked in the early American computer industry before joining the Weizmann Institute.

== Background ==
The first computer built in Israel was WEIZAC, designed and built at Weizmann Institute of Science in 1955 under Chaim Leib Pekeris. It was based on the John von Neumann's computer built at Princeton.

== Golem A ==
At the beginning of 1960, the Department of applied mathematics, headed by Pekeris, began planning a new computer to replace the WEIZAC, which had begun operating in 1955. The new computer was planned to be a hundred times faster than WEIZAC. The computer was first called WEIZAC2, but by advice of the Kabbalah scholar Gershom Scholem was renamed "Golem".

Pekeris invited Smil Ruhman to lead the construction of the new computer. Ruhman had studied electrical engineering at the Worcester Polytechnic Institute and the University of Pennsylvania, and had worked at the Moore School's digital computer laboratory, where he was among the developers of the MSAC and EDVAC computers. He later worked at Raytheon on magnetic circuits and became a co-founder and director of development at Packard Bell's computer division. His earlier work included military and aerospace computer projects and a small computer with about 250 transistors and 4,000 words of memory.

Ruhman was invited to the Weizmann Institute in 1960, after Pekeris became acquainted with him through their mutual colleague Gerald Estrin. He arrived in Israel in 1961 on a Fulbright fellowship, initially expecting to stay at the institute for about nine months, but eventually settled in Israel with his family.

Alongside Ruhman, the project was led by Zvi Rizel, one of the leaders of the WEIZAC project; Miron Melman, an American engineer who worked on the ILLIAC II team in Illinois. Ruhman's wife, Marion Ruhman, also took part in the project as a draftswoman.

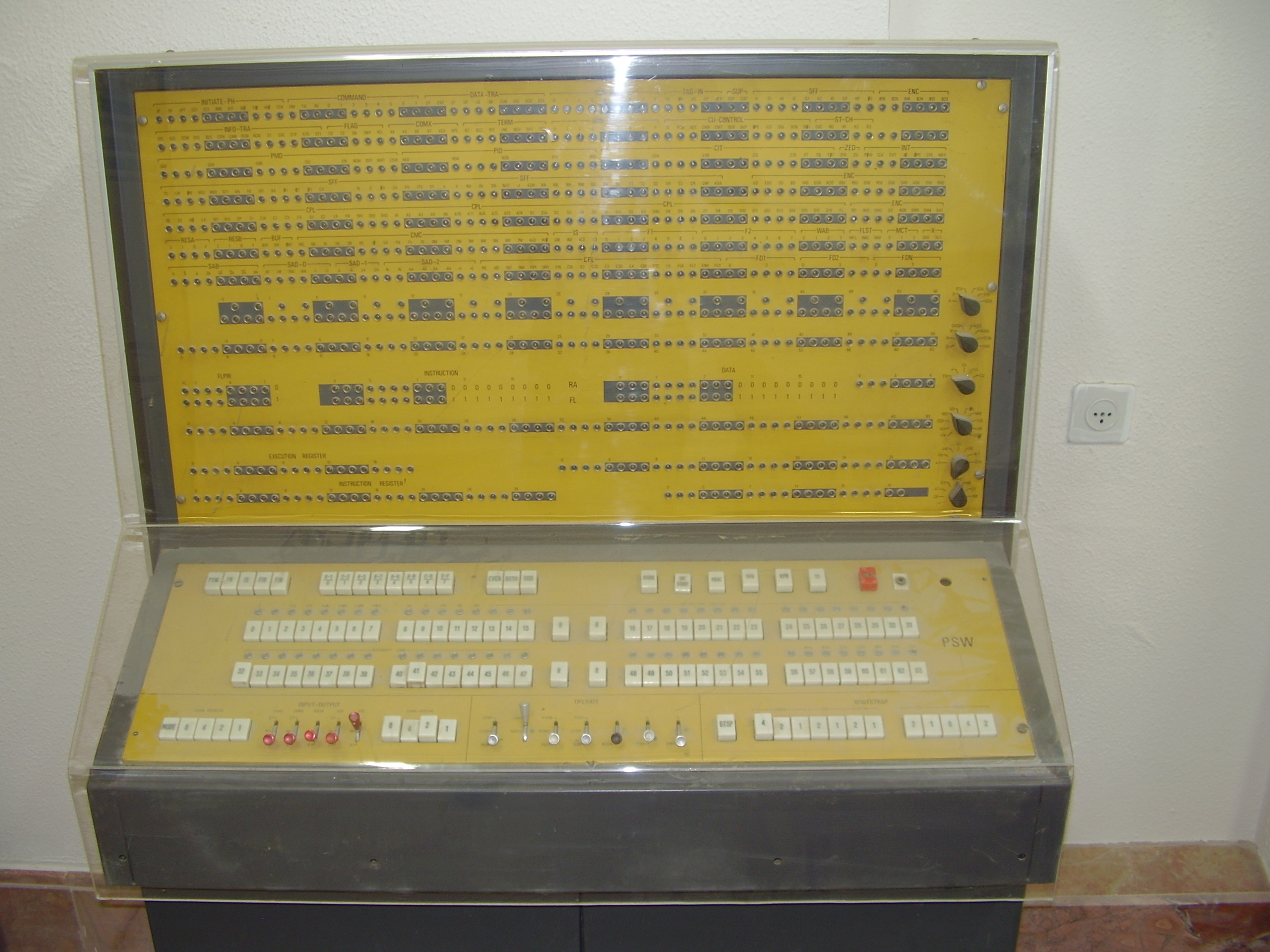
The Golem keyboard

"Golem A" was built over about four years. Its initial cost was estimated at about 2.5 million Israeli pounds, or 800,000 US dollars. It began operating on 29 December 1963. Its success led to the decision to build another identical computer, Golem A-2, which began operating in 1966.

The design of Golem was based on that of the ILLIAC II computer built at the University of Illinois, with several improvements, especially a tenfold reduction in the computer's size and energy consumption.

Gershom Scholem was invited to the opening and gave an speech where he called the new computer "The Golem of Rehovot" and compared Chaim Pekeris to a rabbi:

All my days I have been complaining that the Weizmann Institute has not mobilized the funds to build up the Institute for Experimental Demonology and Magic which I have for so long proposed to establish there. They preferred what they call Applied Mathematics and its sinister possibilities to my more direct magical approach. Little did they know, when they preferred Chaim Pekeris to me, what they were letting themselves in for. So I resign myself and say to the Golem and its creator: develop peacefully and don’t destroy the world. Shalom.

"Golem A" had an unusually large word size of 75 bits. The hardware performed calculations using floating-point arithmetic, with one bit for the sign, 10 bits for the exponent, and 64 bits for the mantissa. Double-word calculation was also possible, with 128 bits for the mantissa. Memory size reached 32K words, compared with 4K words in WEIZAC.

== Golem B ==
Planning of "Golem B" began in 1967, shortly after the second Golem A computer was built. It began operating in 1974 and replaced the earlier "Golem A" computers. "Golem B" operated until 1983.

"Golem B" had a word size of 64 bits. Its memory size reached 131K words.

Like its predecessors, "Golem B" was used for scientific computing according to the research needs of the Department of Applied Mathematics and other departments at the Weizmann Institute, as well as other Israeli research institutions.

== Computer construction at the Weizmann Institute ==
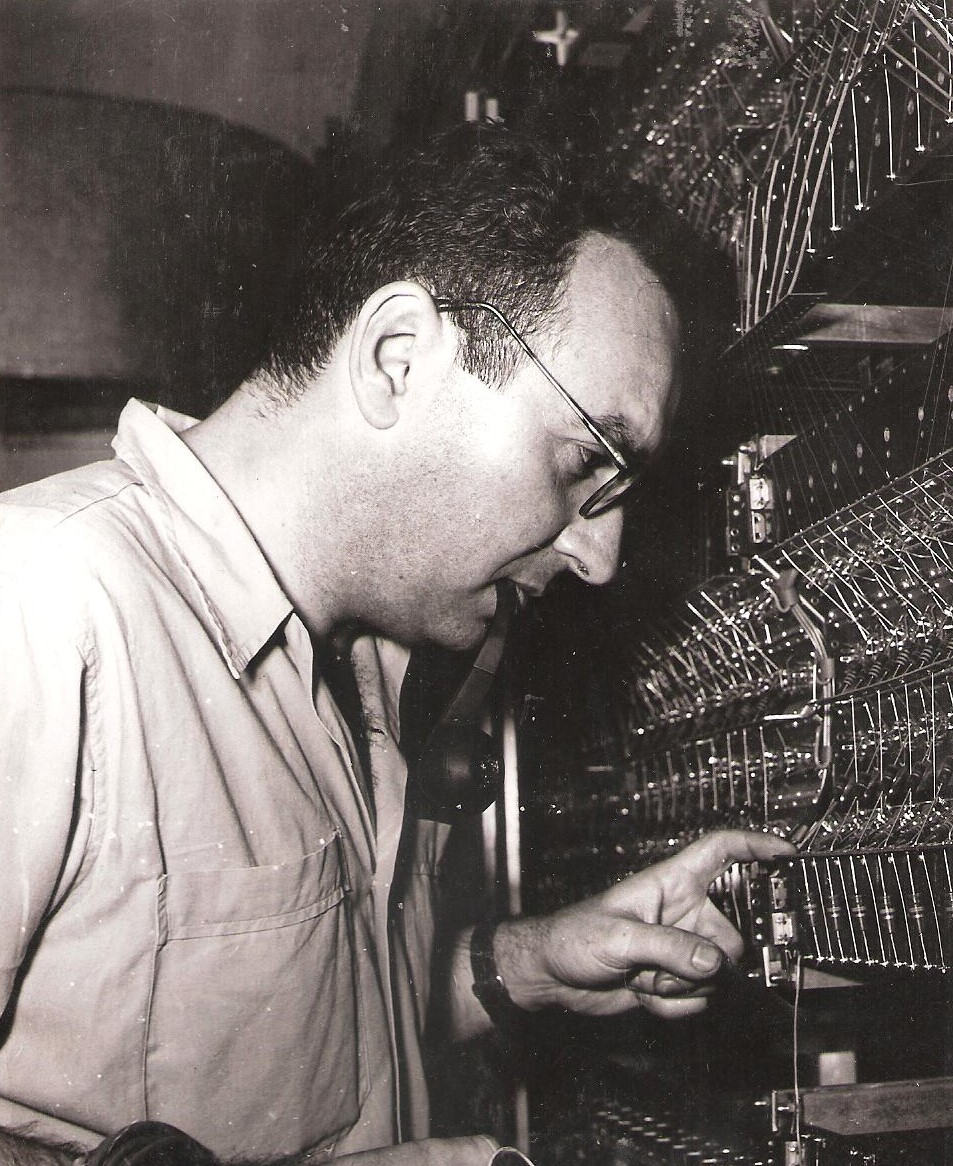
Zvi Rizel with WEIZAC, 1957

WEIZAC was built at a time when computers were not yet a common industrial product, and building a computer independently was the main way to obtain one. Golem was built later; but already in 1963, shortly before "Golem A" began operating, the Weizmann Institute acquired a CDC 1604 computer—the first computer made by Control Data to be sold outside the United States. Golem was considerably cheaper than the alternatives available for purchase, and its design and construction were a research activity in themselves.

The three principal developers of "Golem A"—Smil Ruhman, Zvi Rizel, and Miron Melman—were awarded the Rothschild Prize in engineering in 1969 for the development of the Golem computer. The prize citation stated, among other things, that "the three scientists received the prize jointly in engineering for the sophisticated design of the electronic computer at the Weizmann Institute, which aroused the envy of major research institutions around the world."

Ruhman later became a professor at the Weizmann Institute and, in 1972, head of its Department of Computer Science. His research after the Golem project included work on computers based on magnetic bits rather than transistors, as well as work in machine vision.

"Golem B" marked the end of the period of computer construction at the institute. In practice, already in parallel with it, and even in parallel with "Golem A", the institute operated computers purchased from commercial manufacturers, such as IBM and Digital Equipment Corporation.

== See also ==
- History of computing
- History of computing hardware
