= Decidua menstrualis =

Medical condition

Decidua menstrualis is the diffuse hyperplasia of the decidua of the uterus in the absence of a demonstrable pregnancy. In anatomical terms, it is called diffuse polypoid decidual endometritis. The probable cause of decidua menstrualis is pathologically prolonged progestin stimulation in the absence of a preceding pregnancy. Clinically, the patient presents with prolonged, profused white discharge mixed with blood. It is not clear whether this discharge occurs due to nutritional inadequacy or the involution of corpus luteum.

Gross examination reveals thick, soft, velvety folds of endometrial hypertrophy interspersed in the muscle layer of the uterus, without any evidence of placenta formation. On microscopic examination, premenstrual glandular tissue with infiltration of polymorphonuclear leucocytes is found and chorionic villi are absent. Blood estrin assay is negative. Decidua mensrtualis may be wrongly diagnosed in individuals who do not present the clinical history of recent abortion.
