= Zebra Media Access Control =

Zebra Media Access Control (Z-MAC) is a network protocol for wireless sensor networks. It controls how a Media Access Control (MAC) accesses a common communication medium of a network.

Network protocols define specific details, such as how computers in a computer network exchange data. Sensor networks consist of tiny, wirelessly communicating sensor nodes which are deployed in large numbers in an area to network independently. While the sensors monitor their surroundings, their energy reserves are depleted. They constitute a special form of mobile ad-hoc network and make entirely different demands on a network protocol than, for example, the Internet.

Z-MAC was first introduced by Injong Rhee, Ajit Warrier, Mahesh Aia and Jeongki Min from North Carolina State University in 2005. The protocol is relevant to the protocols S-MAC, T-MAC, DSMAC, WiseMAC, μ-MAC and M-MAC.

== Protocol structure ==
Z-MAC combines the two approaches Carrier-Sense Multiple Access (CSMA) and Time-Division Multiple Access (TDMA) so that the network behaves at low data load as in CSMA and high network traffic as in TDMA.

The protocol begins with a set-up phase, including the following four steps: construction of the network topology, distribution of time slots, exchanging of local time frame and network-wide synchronization. This initialization causes a high load on the network, which is made up for from the perspective of the developer with long service life and efficient data transfer.

=== Construction of the network topology ===
After activation, each sensor node transmits every second ping for 30 seconds. Pings are in the network technology brief messages that are sent back immediately from sender to receiver, usually to check connection and line quality. With Z-MAC, the ping contains information on the sending node itself and all the information that has been collected through the direct neighbors of the node. By pinging the environment experienced by a sensor node, the nodes it directly contacts (one-hop neighborhood) and what it can contact indirectly with an intermediate station (two-hop neighborhood) are known

=== Distribution of the time slots ===
The neighborhood lists are given in an algorithm for allocation of time slot according to TDMA. The developers used the distributed algorithm DRAND. This algorithm ensures that no two indirect neighbors receive the same time slot.

== See also ==
- Sensor Media Access Control
- 802.11
- handshaking
- Load balancer
