= Jennifer Hou =

Taiwanese computer scientist and electrical engineer

Chao-Ju Jennifer Hou (September 26, 1964 – December 2, 2007) was a Taiwanese computer scientist and electrical engineer specializing in wireless sensor networks.

== Life ==
Hou was born on September 26, 1964, in Taipei, and studied electrical engineering at National Taiwan University, graduating with a bachelor's degree in 1987. She came to the US for graduate study in electrical engineering and computer science at the University of Michigan, earning a master's degree in 1989 and a Ph.D. in 1993. Along the way, she also earned a second master's degree in industrial and operations engineering in 1991.

She became an assistant professor at the University of Wisconsin–Madison, in 1993. She moved to Ohio State University in 1996, earning tenure there, and moved again to the University of Illinois Urbana-Champaign in 2001, where she directed the Illinois Network Design and Experimentation (INDEX) group.

She died of cancer on December 2, 2007.

== Recognition ==
Hou was posthumously named an IEEE Fellow in 2008, "for contributions to protocol design and analysis of wireless communications networks". Her fellow certificate was presented to her son at the 2008 Conference on Computer Communications (INFOCOM), which was dedicated to her memory.
