= Bill Carrico =

Bill or William Carrico may refer to:

- Charles William Carrico Sr. (born 1961), known as Bill, American politician from Virginia
- William N. Carrico Jr., known as Bill, computer scientist and businessman
