= Zhihai He =

Zhiha He (何志海) from the University of Missouri in Columbia, Missouri was named Fellow of the Institute of Electrical and Electronics Engineers (IEEE) in 2015 for contributions to video communication and visual sensing technologies.

He is currently the Robert Lee Tatum Distinguished Professor at the Department of Electrical Engineering and Computer Science, University of Missouri.

His research areas include multimedia compression and communication, wireless sensor networks, cyber-physical system, computer vision, and machine learning. Starting from 2003, he pioneered the development and application of wireless vision sensor networks, integrated camera-sensor systems, and smart cyber-physical systems for ecological observation, eldercare, and smart manufacturing.

His recent research focuses on deep learning, specifically, deep metric learning, unsupervised learning, and adversarial attacks and defenses of deep neural networks.
