= Chalermek Intanagonwiwat =

Thai computer scientist

Chalermek Intanagonwiwat (Thai: เฉลิมเอก อินทนากรวิวัฒน์, RTGS: Chaloem-ek Inthanakonwiwat) is a computer scientist best known for his work on directed diffusion under the supervision of Deborah Estrin, Ramesh Govindan, and John Heidemann. In 2013 he moved to San Jose, California to work at Cisco Systems, Inc. Intanagonwiwat earned his bachelor's degree in Computer Engineering from King Mongkut's Institute of Technology Ladkrabang in Thailand and pursued his M.S. and Ph.D. degrees in Computer Science at the University of Southern California, USA. He worked as postdoc researcher at Rutgers University, USA. His research interests include computer networks and distributed systems (particularly, large-scale wireless networks of distributed embedded systems, sensor networks, ad hoc networks, cooperative computing, mobile computing, pervasive computing, and ubiquitous computing). From 2003 - 2013, he taught in the Department of Computer Engineering, Chulalongkorn University.

According to Citeseer Research Index , Dr. Intanagonwiwat is among the top 0.73% most cited authors in Computer Science. Microsoft Academic Search has placed him among the 200 most-cited computer scientists in Networks and Communications.
