= VSN =

VSN may refer to:

- Ottawa based Hip Hop, R&B and Rap Artist VSN (Musician)
- Very Smooth Number, used in a very smooth hash in cryptography
- Virtual sensor network, a type of wireless computer network
- Volontaires de la Sécurité Nationale, also known as Tonton Macoute, a Haitian paramilitary force
