= Bridge Communications =

- Industry: Computer Networks
- Founded: 1981
- Founder: Judy Estrin and Bill Carrico
- Defunct: 1987
- Fate: Acquired
- Successor: 3Com
- Headquarters: Mountain View, California, U.S.
- Products: Network hardware

Bridge Communications, Inc. was an American technology company founded in 1981 by Judy Estrin and Bill Carrico in Mountain View, California. The company developed computer network bridges, routers, and communications servers, specializing in interconnecting different types of networks. According to Estrin, the company shipped the first commercial router.

== History ==
Bridge Communications was founded in June 1981, when Judy Estrin and Bill Carrico left Zilog to address the growing demand for devices that could connect computers running different network protocols. Early on, the company recruited technical leaders who helped develop multi-protocol routing and bridging products.

=== Acquisition by 3Com ===
On September 30, 1987, Bridge Communications was acquired by 3Com. The acquisition allowed 3Com to integrate Bridge Communications’ expertise in multi-protocol networking with its established Ethernet product lines, expanding 3Com’s offerings in both local and wide-area network solutions.

== Products ==
Bridge Communications produced a variety of networking equipment designed to operate across multiple protocols:

- Network Bridges and Routers: Devices supporting protocols such as TCP/IP, DECnet, XNS, and IBM’s Systems Network Architecture (SNA), enabling heterogeneous systems to communicate.
- Communications Servers: Terminal servers and similar devices that allowed multiple users to access central computing resources over different network types.

These products helped enterprises unify disparate networks at a time when proprietary standards often prevented interoperability.

== Legacy ==
Bridge Communications is remembered for its role in pioneering multi-protocol routers. According to co-founder Judy Estrin, the company’s shipments included some of the earliest commercial routers, anticipating the move toward the open-standards Internet Protocol (IP). After the acquisition, many of Bridge Communications’ technologies and personnel were integrated into 3Com, which continued to expand its network product portfolio.
