= WEIZAC =

First computer in the Middle East

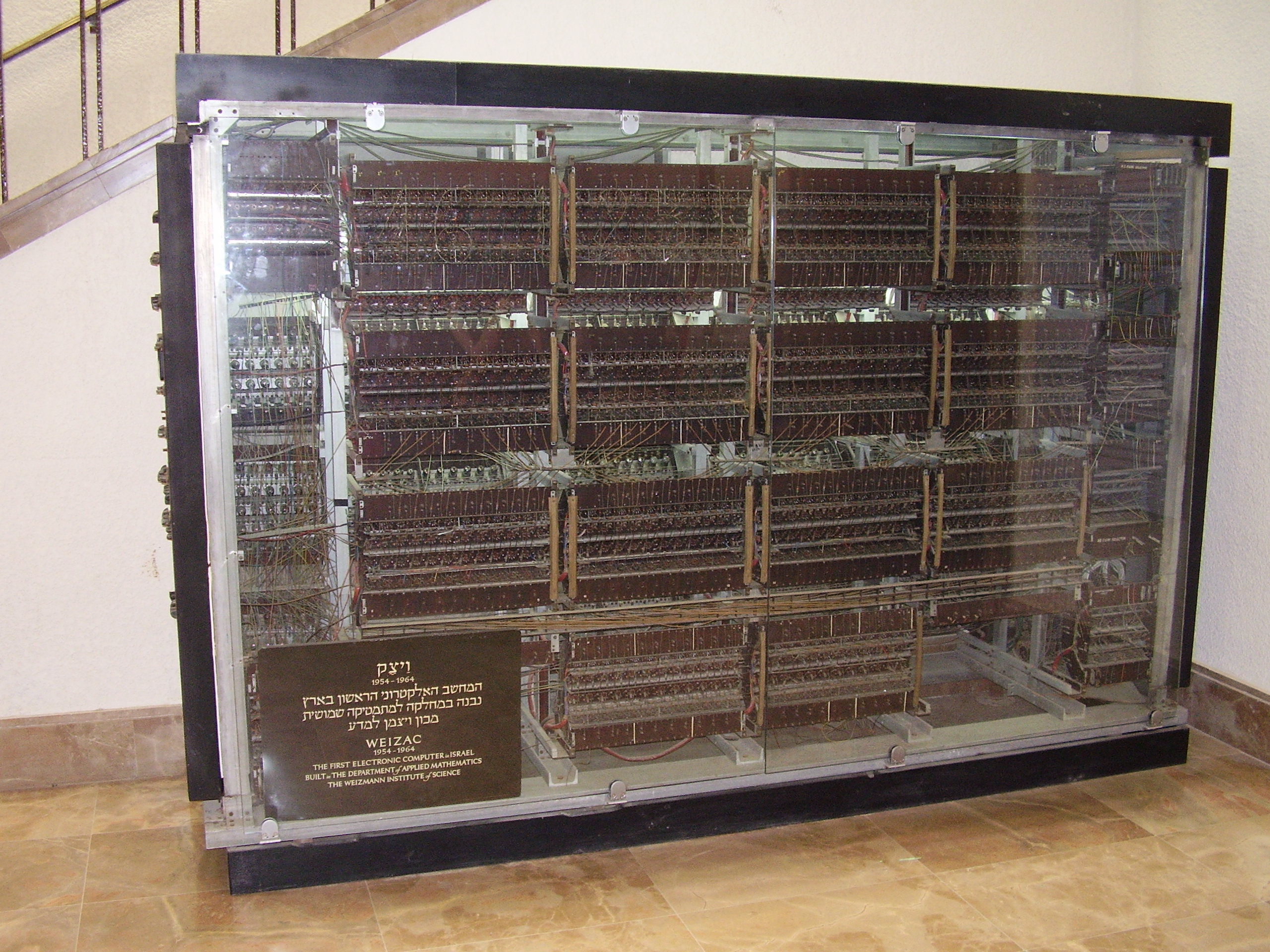
Section of WEIZAC on display at Weizmann Institute

WEIZAC (Weizmann Automatic Computer) was the first computer in Israel, and one of the first large-scale, stored-program, electronic computers in the world.

It was built at the Weizmann Institute during 1954–1955, based on the Institute for Advanced Study (IAS) architecture developed by John von Neumann and was operational until the end of 1963. WEIZAC was widely used by Israeli scientists and researchers and helped with the advancement of science and technology in the young nation.

== History ==
WEIZAC construction

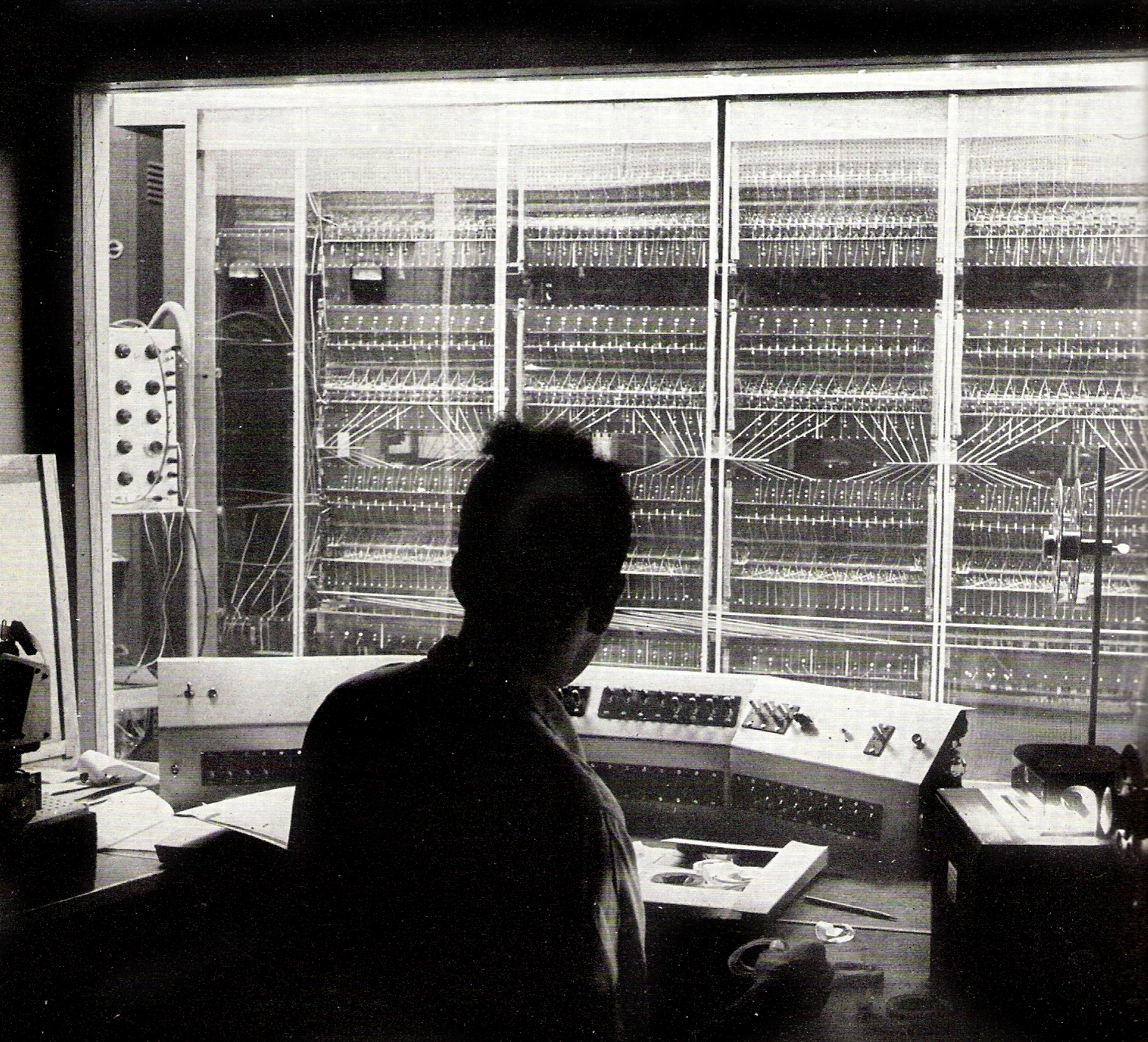
WEIZAC in use

The WEIZAC project was initiated by Prof. Chaim L. Pekeris, who worked at the IAS at the time von Neumann's IAS machine was being designed. Chaim Weizmann, Israel's future first president, asked Pekeris to establish the Department of Applied Mathematics at the Weizmann Institute, and Pekeris wanted to have a similar computer available there. Pekeris wanted it as means to solve Laplace’s tidal equations for the Earth's oceans, and also for the benefit of the entire scientific community of Israel, including the Defense Ministry.

In July 1947, an advisory committee for the Applied Mathematics Department discussed the plan to build the computer. Among the committee's members were Albert Einstein, who did not find the idea reasonable, and John von Neumann, who supported it. In one conversation, von Neumann was asked: "What will that tiny country do with an electric computer?" He responded: "Don’t worry about that problem. If nobody else uses the computer, Pekeris will use it full time!"

In the end, a decision was made to proceed with the plan. Chaim Weizmann assigned US$50,000 for the project (equivalent to $720,939 in 2025), which was 20% of the Weizmann Institute total budget.

In 1952, Gerald Estrin, a research engineer from the von Neumann project, was chosen to lead the project. He came to Israel along with his wife, Thelma, who was an electrical engineer and also involved in the project. They brought with them schematics, but no parts. Estrin later commented: "As I look back now, if we had systematically laid out a detailed plan of execution we would probably have aborted the project." After arriving, Estrin's impression was that besides Pekeris, other Israeli scientists thought it is ridiculous to build a computer in Israel.

To recruit skilled staff for the project, a newspaper advertisement was posted. Most of the applicants had no records of prior education because those were lost in the Holocaust or during immigration, but in Israel's budding technical community everyone knew or knew about everybody else. The WEIZAC project also provided an opportunity for mathematicians and engineers to move to Israel without sacrificing their professional careers.

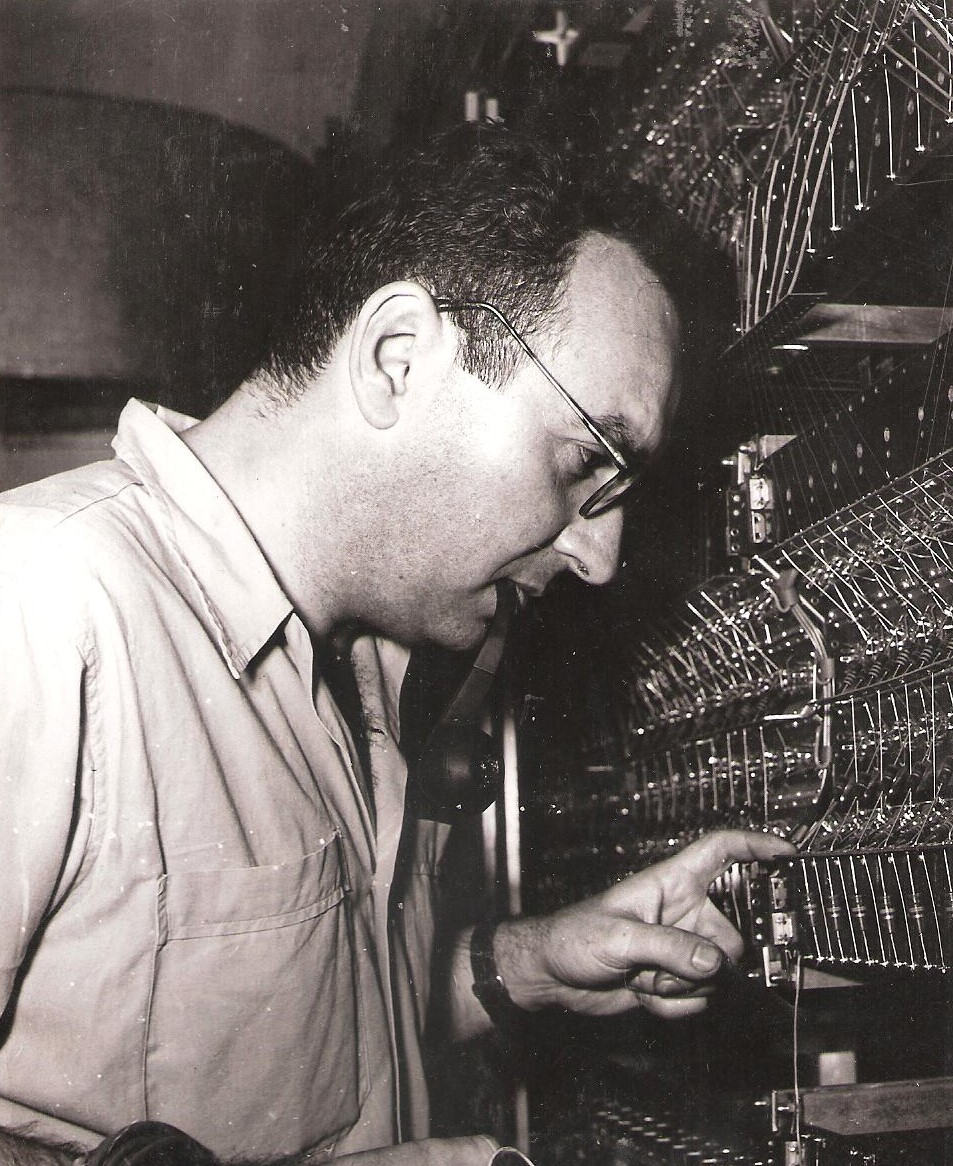
Zvi Rizel with WEIZAC, 1957

WEIZAC performed its first calculation in October 1955. Subsequently, it was used to study problems like worldwide changes in tide, earthquakes, atomic spectroscopy, X-ray crystallography, random walk methods, numerical analysis, and other problems. The computer found out that there was an amphidromic point in the South Atlantic at which the tide does not change. It also numerically calculated the eigenvalues of a two-electron atom quantum system based on programming by Yigal Accad who put Pekeris' development of the relevant equations into machine code. These results were later experimentally verified by the Brookhaven National Laboratory.

WEIZAC was kept constantly busy, and users (especially from other institutions) became increasingly frustrated with not being able to get computing time, and demanded more computers to become available. WEIZAC's success led to the recognition of the demand for computers and digital technology in Israel, and ultimately, provided the foundation for Israel's computer and technology industries.

== Specifications ==
WEIZAC was an asynchronous computer operating on 40-bit words. Instructions consisted of twenty bits: an eight-bit instruction code and twelve bits for addressing. Punched paper tape was used for I/O, and later, in 1958, magnetic tape. The memory was initially a magnetic drum containing 1,024 words which was later replaced with a much faster 4,096 word magnetic-core memory module. In 1961, the memory was further expanded with two additional 4,096 word modules.

As with almost all computers of its era, it was a one-of-a-kind machine that could not exchange programs with other computers (even other IAS machines).

== After WEIZAC ==
Until 1961, WEIZAC was the only computer in the State of Israel; it operated until 29 December 1963. The institute also bought a commercially built computer, a CDC 1604A. At the same time the institute's staff began working on Golem, based on the ILLIAC II architecture, but with several improvements.

== Recognition ==
On 5 December 2006, WEIZAC was recognized by the IEEE as a milestone in the history of electrical engineering and computing, and the team who built it was awarded the "WEIZAC Medal".

== Bibliography ==
- The WEIZAC Years (1954-1963), Gerald Estrin, IEEE Annals of the History of Computing, vol. 13, no. 4, pp. 317–339, Oct-Dec 1991. ISSN 1058-6180.
- Corry, Leo, Raya Leviathan (2019). WEIZAC: An Israeli Pioneering Adventure in Electronic Computing (1945–1963). New York: Springer Verlag.
- Corry, Leo, Raya Leviathan (2023). Chaim L. Pekeris and the Art of Applying Mathematics with WEIZAC (1955–1963). New York: Springer Verlag.
