= Packet Design =

Packet Design, LLC
- Type: Private
- Industry: Computer Software
- Founded: Palo Alto, California (2003)
- Headquarters: Austin
- Key people: Judy Estrin; Bill Carrico
- Website: Packet Design

Packet Design was an Austin, Texas-based network performance management software company credited with pioneering route analytics technology. This network monitoring technology analyzes routing protocols and structures in meshed IP networks by participating as a peer in the network to passively “listen” to Layer 3 routing protocol exchanges between routers for the purpose of network discovery, mapping, real-time monitoring and routing diagnostics.

The company maintained offices in San Jose, CA, Austin, TX, Dubai, UAE, and Pune, India. In June 2018, Ciena announced it would acquire Packet Design LLC and the transaction closed July 2, 2018.

== History ==
Packet Design, Inc. was co-founded in 2003, by Judy Estrin and Bill Carrico, network computing executives who have started seven companies together during their careers. Estrin served as chief technology officer of Cisco Systems from 1998 to 2000, immediately prior to founding the company.

Packet Design was acquired by Lone Rock Technology Group, the private equity firm of former NetQoS CEO, Joel Trammell, in March 2013. With the acquisition, Packet Design, Inc. became Packet Design, LLC and Scott Sherwood was named as CEO.

For a number of years, Hewlett Packard offered OEM-licensed versions of Packet Design's products integrated alongside their HP Network Node Manager called HP Route Analytics Management Software (RAMS). Packet Design terminated the agreement and RAMS customers now receive support from Packet Design.
