= Gene Tsudik =

Computer scientist

- Education: University of Southern California (PhD, 1991)
- Known for: Internet security, privacy, distributed systems, IoT security
- Awards: Fulbright Scholar and Specialist (3×); IEEE Fellow (2013); ACM Fellow (2014); Academia Europaea Member (2015); AAAS Fellow (2016); IFIP Fellow (2019); Guggenheim Fellow (2024)
- Scientific career
- Fields: Computer science, Computer security, Privacy
- Workplaces: University of California, Irvine; IBM Zurich Research Laboratory; Information Sciences Institute
- Thesis: (1991)
- Doctoral advisor: Deborah Estrin
- Doctoral students: https://ics.uci.edu/~gtsudik/students.html
- Website: ics.uci.edu/~gts

Gene Tsudik is a Distinguished and "ICS Alumni" Professor of Computer Science at the University of California, Irvine (UCI).

He obtained his PhD in computer science from USC in 1991. His PhD advisor was Deborah Estrin (he was her first PhD student).

Gene Tsudik was a researcher at IBM Zurich Research Laboratory (1991–1996) and the Information Sciences Institute (1996–2000). Tsudik is a Fulbright scholar, Fulbright specialist (thrice), a fellow of ACM, IEEE, AAAS and IFIP, and a foreign member of Academia Europaea. From 2009 to 2015 he served as editor-in-chief of ACM Transactions on Privacy and Security (TOPS). He received the 2017 ACM SIGSAC Outstanding Contribution Award, the 2020 IFIP Jean-Claude Laprie Award, and the 2023 ACM SIGSAC Outstanding Innovation Award. He was awarded a 2024 Guggenheim Fellowship (the only one in Computer Science), and, in 2026, he received a Humboldt Research Award.

== Honors ==
- Fellow of the Institute of Electrical and Electronics Engineers (IEEE) in 2013 for contributions to distributed systems security and privacy
- Fellow of the Association for Computing Machinery (ACM) in 2014 for contributions to Internet security and privacy
- Foreign Member of Academia Europaea (AE) in 2015 for contributions to Internet security and privacy
- Fellow of the American Association for the Advancement of Science (AAAS) in 2016 for contributions to security and privacy of the Internet
- Fellow of the International Federation for Information Processing (IFIP) in 2019 for contributions to security and privacy of the Internet
- Guggenheim Fellow in 2024 Project Title: Staving Off the IoT Armageddon
- Humboldt Research Award in 2026
