= John Heidemann =

American computer scientist

John Heidemann is an engineer at the USC Information Sciences Institute in Marina del Rey, California. He was named a Fellow of the Institute of Electrical and Electronics Engineers (IEEE) in 2014 for his contributions to sensor networks, internet measurement, and simulations. He has authored more than two hundred and fifty scholarly papers in these fields. His research has been supported by the American National Science Foundation, among others.

John Heidemann was very active in the field of sensor networks in the 2000s. With Nirupama Bulusu and Deborah Estrin, he developed the first wireless, range-free localization system for wireless sensor networks. With Wei Ye and Deborah Estrin he developed S-MAC, an early energy-conserving media access protocol for wireless networks.

During the next decade, his work examined Internet measurement, including the first complete IPv4 census (scan) in 2006, techniques to detect network outages in the Internet, and evaluation of anycast stability and under denial-of-service attack. He received the SIGCOMM Networking Prize for his leadership of the NS-2 simulator and the best paper award at the PAM conference in 2017 for his anycast measurement study.

Heidemann currently lives in Los Angeles but his home town is Lincoln, Nebraska where he is the DNS administrator for the Lincoln.NE.US branch of the US-Domain.

== Software ==
- Notes-Mode, an Emacs extension for organizing on-line note-taking. This package, which development started in 1994 with the aim to help in organizing his academic notes, was maintained over the years and published by GNU ELPA for the first time in 2012.
