= European Conference on Wireless Sensor Networks =

Annual conference on embedded wireless systems and networks

The International Conference on Embedded Wireless Systems and Networks (EWSN) is an annual, single-track academic conference on embedded wireless systems and networks, including wireless sensor networks, the Internet of Things, and cyber-physical systems.

The conference was established in 2004 as the European Workshop on Wireless Sensor Networks (EWSN), was renamed to the European Conference on Wireless Sensor Networks in 2007, and has been known as the International Conference on Embedded Wireless Systems and Networks since 2016.

== History ==
EWSN was first held in 2004 in Berlin, Germany, as the European Workshop on Wireless Sensor Networks. The event was created as a venue for research on wireless sensor networks and initially ran as a workshop.

In 2007, the event was upgraded to a conference and renamed the European Conference on Wireless Sensor Networks while keeping the acronym EWSN.

By the mid‑2010s, research presented at EWSN had expanded from wireless sensor networks into related areas such as the Internet of Things and cyber-physical systems, all sharing a focus on wirelessly networked embedded systems. To reflect this broader scope, the 2016 edition in Graz, Austria, introduced the current name International Conference on Embedded Wireless Systems and Networks, while retaining the acronym EWSN.

The conference has been held annually at various European destinations, including Berlin, Istanbul, Zurich, Delft, Bologna, Cork, Coimbra, Bonn, Trento, Ghent, Oxford, Porto, Graz, Uppsala, Madrid, Lyon, Delft, Linz, Rende and Leuven, and outside Europe in Beijing (China) and Abu Dhabi (United Arab Emirates).

== Scope and format ==
EWSN is a single-track conference focused on research at the intersection of embedded systems and wireless networking. Its scope includes wireless sensor networks, embedded wireless systems, Internet of Things systems and protocols, and cyber-physical systems.

Beginning with the 2016 edition, the conference introduced a featured topic each year "to put a focus on a hot topic, but without excluding other topics in scope of the conference". In 2016 the featured topic was dependability, reflecting the increasing use of wirelessly networked embedded systems in safety-critical applications such as smart production systems; the program included a dependability competition on reliable networking under interference.

== Recognition and rankings ==
EWSN has been included in the ICORE conference rankings. It received an A ranking in the 2018 and 2020 editions and a B ranking in the 2021, 2023 and 2026 editions.

== Proceedings and publication ==
EWSN proceedings are indexed in the ACM Digital Library, Scopus, and DBLP. Proceedings from EWSN editions between 2004 and 2015 were published by Springer Nature in the Lecture Notes in Computer Science series. Since 2016, the conference has been held in cooperation with ACM SIGBED and ACM SIGMOBILE, and its proceedings have been published electronically in the ACM Digital Library under an open-access model.

== Ethics and code of conduct ==
EWSN publishes an ethics and code of conduct statement covering professional behaviour, non-discrimination, and research integrity, as well as procedures for reporting violations.
