= William N. Carrico Jr. =

American computer scientist

Bill Carrico
- Born: William N. Carrico Jr. February 12, 1950 (age 76)
- Education: Santa Clara University (BSEE)

William "Bill" N. Carrico Jr. (born February 12, 1950) is an American computer scientist and businessman who founded several technology companies in Silicon Valley. He was the president and CEO of 3Com, senior vice president of Cisco Systems, and chairman of Packet Design.

== Education ==
Carrico graduated from Santa Clara University in 1972 with a Bachelor of Science in Electrical Engineering (BSEE).

== Career ==
Carrico worked for Fairchild Semiconductor and Zilog. He and Judith Estrin co-founded Bridge Communications in 1981, which merged with 3Com in 1987. The couple joined Network Computing Devices in 1988. Carrico and Estrin also co-founded Precept Software in 1995 (acquired by Cisco Systems in 1998) and Packet Design in 2000.
