= Judith Estrin =

American businesswoman

- Born: 1954/1955; United States
- Education: University of California, Los Angeles (BA); Stanford University (MS)
- Occupations: Entrepreneur; Business executive; Philanthropist
- Years active: 1970s–present
- Employer(s): JLABS, LLC
- Known for: Co-founding multiple technology companies; Early work on TCP/IP; Chief Technology Officer of Cisco Systems
- Title: Chief Executive Officer
- Spouse: William N. Carrico Jr. (div.)
- Children: 2

Judith "Judy" L. Estrin (born 1954/1955) is an American entrepreneur, business executive, and philanthropist. She co-founded eight technology companies. Estrin worked with Vinton Cerf on the Transmission Control Protocol project at Stanford University in the 1970s. She was the chief technology officer of Cisco Systems from 1998 to 2000. Since 2007, Estrin has been the CEO of JLABS, LLC, a privately held company focused on furthering innovation in business, government, and nonprofit organizations.

== Early life and education ==
Estrin's parents, Thelma and Gerald Estrin, were computer scientists at the University of California, Los Angeles. Estrin is the middle of three sisters, each recognized for successful careers. Her sister, Deborah Estrin, is a professor of computer science. Growing up, Estrin focused on academics, developing her knowledge and following the model of her parents. Estrin was passionate about folk dance in high school.

Estrin earned a bachelor's degree in mathematics and computer science from UCLA and a master's degree in electrical engineering from Stanford University in 1977. At Stanford, Estrin worked with the research group headed by Vinton Cerf, an Internet pioneer often called one of the "fathers of the Internet". Cerf's team developed the specifications for Transmission Control Protocol/Internet Protocol, also known as TCP/IP. Her specific role within the research team was to help with the initial tests of the TCP working with University College London. She also investigated Ethernet technology, which connected computers in the local area together.

== Career ==
After Stanford, she worked at a startup semiconductor company called Zilog Corporation that had separated from Intel, where she contributed to the design of the Z8 and Z8000 microprocessors. She led the team that developed one of the first commercial local area network systems called Z-net.

At Zilog, Estrin decided to create a company focused on networks, which were experiencing a boom at that time. She wanted to work in a marketing role, where she could explain what networks did and how they worked. In 1981, Estrin co-founded Bridge Communications with her husband, whom she later divorced. Bridge Communications manufactured network routers, bridges, and communications servers. Bridge became a publicly traded company in 1985, and merged with 3Com in 1987. While her husband focused on administration, Estrin ran the technology and engineering side, and became director of marketing and sales. After the merger with 3Com, Estrin and her husband had problems co-managing, and left the company nine months later. In 1988, they offered to join the founding team of Network Computing Devices (NCD) as executive vice president, later becoming president and CEO in 1993.

In 1995, six months after leaving NCD, Estrin co-founded Precept Software, Inc., which developed networking software. She served as its president and CEO until its acquisition by Cisco Systems in 1998, when she became its chief technology officer and senior vice president of Cisco Systems until 2000.

Estrin was listed as one of the "50 most powerful businesswomen in the United States" by Fortune in 1998.

In 2000, Estrin co-founded Packet Design, LLC, a networking technology company, with her husband William N. Carrico, Jr., with $24 million in funding from the venture firm Foundation Capital and private investors, including Estrin, Carrico, James Barksdale, Bill Joy, and Frank Quattrone. Packet Design later spun out three venture-backed startups, including Packet Design, Inc. At Packet Design, she worked on advanced network technology. During this time, she divorced her husband. She served as CEO of Packet Design, LLC, until it was dissolved, distributing its assets to investors in late 2007. After Packet Design, she created JLABS, LLC, which she considered a way to pursue her interests in innovation and leadership. She became the CEO of Evntlive, a tech company founded by her son David Carrico, in 2013.

In 2025, Estrin was elected to the National Academy of Engineering.

=== Author ===
Estrin is the author of Closing the Innovation Gap: Reigniting the Spark of Creativity in a Global Economy (McGraw-Hill; Hardcover, September 2008), which challenges national, academic and business leaders to work together to make the United States competitive again.

=== Board positions ===
Estrin served on the boards of FedEx Corporation (1989-2010), Rockwell Automation (1994-1998), Sun Microsystems (1995-2003), as well as the Walt Disney Company, where she served for fifteen years (1998-2014). She served on the Innovation Advisory Board of America COMPETES in 2011.
