= Chaim L. Pekeris =

Israeli-American physicist and mathematician

Chaim Leib Pekeris
- חיים לייב פקריס
- Born: June 15, 1908; Alytus, Vilna Governorate, Russian Empire
- Died: February 24, 1993 (aged 84); Rehovot, Israel
- Education: Massachusetts Institute of Technology
- Known for: WEIZAC, surface waves, stability of pipe flow
- Spouse: Leah Kaplan
- Awards: Gold Medal of the Royal Astronomical Society (1980); Israel Prize (1980)
- Scientific career
- Fields: Geophysics
- Workplaces: Massachusetts Institute of Technology; Columbia University; Institute for Advanced Study; Weizmann Institute of Science

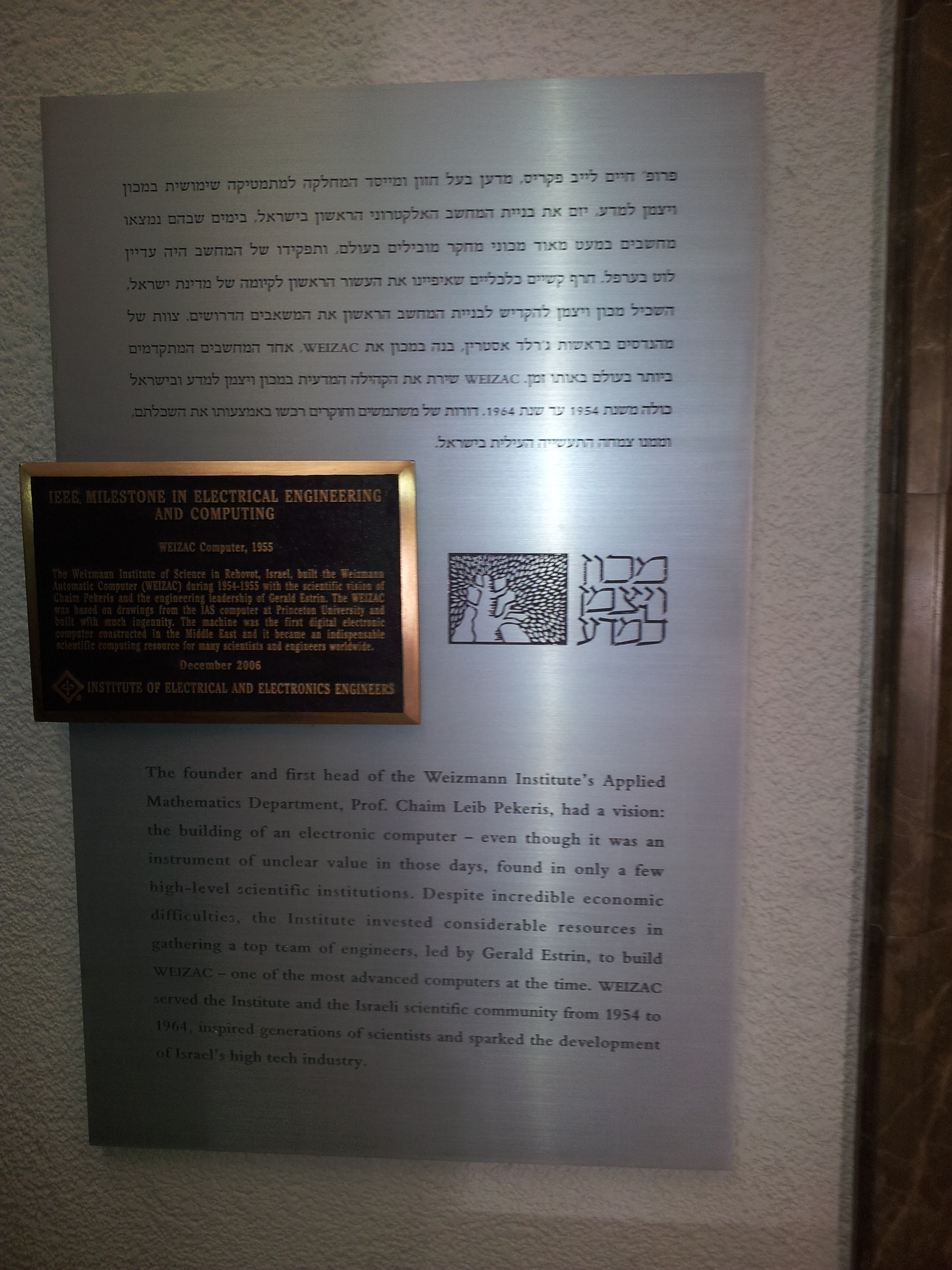

Chaim Leib Pekeris (Hebrew: חיים לייב פקריס; June 15, 1908 – February 24, 1993) was an Israeli-American physicist and mathematician. He made notable contributions to geophysics and the spectral theory of many-electron atoms, in particular the helium atom. He was also one of the designers of the first computer in Israel, WEIZAC.

== Biography ==
Pekeris was born in Alytus, Vilna Governorate on June 15, 1908. With the assistance of his uncle, Pekeris and his two brothers emigrated to the United States around 1925. He entered the Massachusetts Institute of Technology in 1925 graduating in 1929 with a B.Sc. in meteorology. Pekeris also took his graduate studies at MIT, studying under Carl-Gustav Rossby. In January 1933 he married Lea Kaplan, who was also born in Lithuania. He graduated with his Sc.D. doctoral degree in 1934.

In 1934 Pekeris joined the faculty at M.I.T. as an instructor in geophysics in the department of geology. He became a US citizen in 1938. Pekeris remained at M.I.T until 1941 when he moved to the Hudson Laboratories of Columbia University to conduct military research. In 1946 he joined the Institute for Advanced Study.

Pekeris and his wife moved to Israel in 1948, where he joined the Weizmann Institute as head of its department of applied mathematics in 1949. During the 1948 Arab–Israeli War he was involved in a clandestine program in New York State developing munitions for the newborn State of Israel.

In July 1947, an advisory committee for the Applied Mathematics Department of the Weizmann Institute discussed the plan to build the computer. Among the committee's members were Albert Einstein, who did not find the idea reasonable, and John von Neumann, who supported it. In one conversation, von Neumann was asked: "What will that tiny country do with an electric computer?" He responded: "Don’t worry about that problem. If nobody else uses the computer, Pekeris will use it full time!"

The WEIZAC project was initiated by Pekeris, who wanted it as means to solve Laplace’s tidal equations for the Earth's oceans, and also for the benefit of the entire scientific community of Israel, including the Defense Ministry. WEIZAC's first computation was done in October 1955.

Pekeris received the Gold Medal from the Royal Astronomical Society in 1980, and the Israel Prize from the State of Israel in 1981. Teddy Kollek, the mayor of Jerusalem from 1965 to 1993, said in 1990: "I have told you a lot about Chaim Pekeris tonight and there is much more that I could tell, but you will understand that there are reasons that I can’t. Let me simply say that Chaim Pekeris played a most significant role in the establishment of the State of Israel." He died in Rehovot, Israel on February 24, 1993.

== Awards and honors ==
- Rockefeller Fellow (1934)
- Fellow of the American Physical Society (1941)
- Guggenheim Fellowship (1946)
- Weizmann Prize for Exact Sciences (1958)
- Member of the American Philosophical Society (1971)
- Member of the National Academy of Sciences (1972)
- Vetlesen Prize (1974)
- Member of the American Philosophical Society (1974)
- Gold Medal of the Royal Astronomical Society (1980)
- Israel Prize, for physics (1980).

== See also ==
- List of Israel Prize recipients
- List of geophysicists
