= Center for Embedded Network Sensing =

American research organization

The Center for Embedded Networked Sensing (CENS) was a research enterprise funded by the National Science Foundation based at the University of California, Los Angeles.

CENS was established at UCLA in 2002. The group conducted research primarily in the computer science subfield of embedded sensor networks. While the core research was grounded in computer science, the applications studied spanned a large range of fields including military applications, ecology, seismology, security monitoring, and farming applications to name just a few.

While it was headquartered at UCLA, the following universities and organizations also participated in CENS-led research:

- University of California, Merced
- University of California, Riverside
- University of Southern California
  - The USC Information Sciences Institute
- California State University, Los Angeles
- The James Reserve
- NASA's Jet Propulsion Laboratory
- Caltech
