= Thelma Estrin =

American computer scientist and engineer (1924–2014)

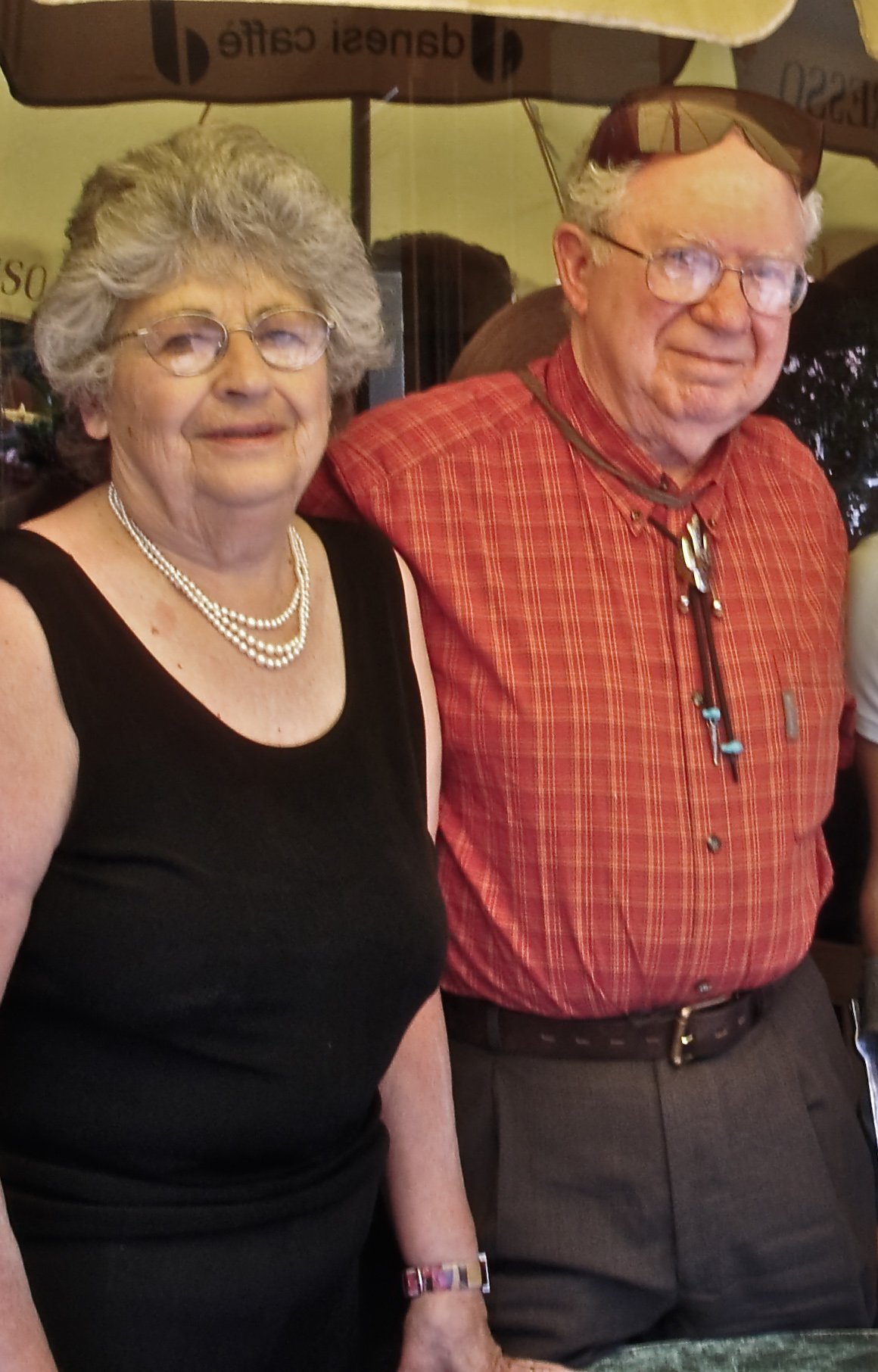
- Thelma Estrin with her husband Gerald. Santa Monica, California. Sept. 2007.
- Born: Thelma Austern; 21 February 1924; New York City, U.S.
- Died: 15 February 2014 (aged 89); Santa Monica, California, U.S.
- Education: University of Wisconsin–Madison (BS, MS, PhD)
- Spouse: Gerald Estrin
- Children: Margot Estrin; Judy Estrin; Deborah Estrin
- Awards: Fulbright Scholarship (1963); IEEE Centennial Medal (1984); IEEE Haraden Pratt Award (1991)
- Scientific career
- Fields: Computer science
- Workplaces: Columbia Presbyterian Hospital; Los Angeles Valley College; Weizmann Institute of Science; UCLA
- Thesis: Determination of the capacitance of annular-plate capacitors by the method of subareas (1951)
- Doctoral advisor: Thomas J. Higgins

Thelma Estrin (née Austern; February 21, 1924 – February 15, 2014) was an American computer scientist and engineer who did pioneering work in the fields of expert systems and biomedical engineering. Estrin was one of the first to apply computer technology to healthcare and medical research. In 1954, Estrin helped to design the Weizmann Automatic Computer, or WEIZAC, the first computer in Israel and the Middle East, a moment marked as an IEEE Milestone in Electrical and Computer Engineering. She was professor emerita in the Department of Computer Science, University of California at Los Angeles (UCLA).

== Early life and education ==
Estrin was born Thelma Austern in New York City in 1924 and attended public schools there. Demonstrating an early aptitude for mathematics, she began her higher education at City College of New York (CCNY) in 1941. In the same year she met her soon-to-be husband, Gerald Estrin, while at CCNY, marrying him when she was only 17. In 1942, Estrin took a three-month engineering assistant course at Stevens Institute of Technology in 1942, when Gerald entered the Army during World War II. Soon after she worked for two years at Radio Receptor Company building electronic devices where she developed an interest in engineering.

In 1946, Estrin and her husband moved to Madison, Wisconsin, to pursue undergraduate degrees in electrical engineering at the University of Wisconsin-Madison (UW). In 1948, Estrin received a Bachelor of Science, her first of three degrees in electrical engineering from UW. Subsequently, she received her Master of Science and Doctor of Philosophy in 1949 and 1951, respectively.

== Princeton and biomedical engineering research 1951–1953 ==
Estrin moved to Princeton, New Jersey, in the early 1950s. In 1951, Thelma obtained a research position in the Electroencephalograph Department of the Neurological Institute of New York at Columbia Presbyterian Hospital in New York City, where she developed an interest in biomedical engineering.

== Move to UCLA – 1953 ==
Gerald obtained a teaching position at UCLA in 1953 and they moved to Los Angeles. When Thelma's husband began working at UCLA, she was not able to work there too because of nepotism, so she started working at a junior college, Los Angeles Valley College in San Fernando Valley, CA, where she taught drafting. Shortly afterwards she and Gerald went to Israel, where they helped to build the first computer there, the Weizmann Automatic Computer, or WEIZAC, in 1954. After their return, Thelma became associated with the Brain Research Institute at UCLA in 1960, and organized the Institute's Data Processing Laboratory in 1961; she served as director of the Data Processing Laboratory from 1970 to 1980. During her tenure she designed and developed one of the first analog-to-digital conversion systems that could convert analog signals from electroencephalograms (EEG) to digital signals.

== Professor of computer science, UCLA – 1980 ==
In 1980, she accepted a position as professor in the Computer Science Department of the School of Engineering and Applied Science. From 1982 to 1984 she held a rotating position at the National Science Foundation as director of the Electrical, Computer, and Systems Research Division. She has served as president of the IEEE Engineering in Medicine and Biology Society, and the first female executive vice president of IEEE.

== Women's studies and computer science ==
Estrin published a 1996 paper on women’s studies and computer science to discuss the intersections of the two disciplines as they "both evolved as academic disciplines in the 1960s, but they evolved along very different paths." In this paper, Estrin connects feminist epistemology and its pedagogical values to ways computer science could become "more relevant for minority and low-income students." Estrin explains that women's studies did not broach the science and engineering subfields of computing and biomedical engineering, which she says were "creating tools for exploration of women's health and reproductive rights," until 25 years after its founding; instead, women's studies focused on the "immediate experience of women" through humanities disciplines. "Women's studies," Estrin writes, "implies that we expand the world of science and technology from its patriarchal history, which consider these disciplines as inherently masculine." She writes that women's studies seeks to "understand the elements of gender in the social and political situations" and it is necessary in order to "widen women's access to technology."

== Awards and honors ==
In 1984, she received the IEEE Centennial Medal. In 1989 she was awarded the honorary degree of doctor of science from the University of Wisconsin-Madison. She was awarded a Fulbright Fellowship at the Weizmann Institute in Israel to study EEG patterns in epileptics in 1963. She received an Outstanding Engineer of the Year Award from the California Institute for the Advancement of Engineering, an Achievement Award from the Society of Women Engineers (1981), the inaugural Service Award (1982) by the Association for Women in Computing, the IEEE Haraden Pratt Award (1991), and the Superior Accomplishment Award from the National Science Foundation. She was a Fellow of IEEE, a Fellow of the American Academy of Arts and Sciences, a Fellow of the Society of Women Engineers, and a Founding Fellow of the American Institute for Medical and Biological Engineering.

== Personal life and death ==
Estrin retired at the age of 67 in July 1991. Thelma Estrin had three daughters. Margo Estrin is a medical doctor, Deborah Estrin is a computer scientist, and Judith Estrin is a corporate executive.

Thelma Estrin died February 15, 2014, less than two years after her husband of 70 years.
