= Evntlive =

- Founded: January 2012
- Fate: Acquired by Yahoo
- Headquarters: Redwood City, California, United States
- Area served: Worldwide
- Key people: Judy Estrin (CEO); Alex Beckman (CCO); David Carrico (CMO)
- Website: www.evntlive.com

Evntlive was an interactive digital concert venue that allowed music fans worldwide to stream concerts to their computer, tablet, or phone. Based in Redwood City, CA, EVNTLIVE Beta launched on April 15, 2013. EVNTLIVE provided users with the ability to switch camera angles, view All Access interviews and clips from artists, buy music, and chat with other online concert-goers in the in-app feature. Users could watch live and on-demand concerts with both free and pay-per-view concerts offered.

In its first two months, EVNTLIVE streamed live performances of popular artists ranging from Bon Jovi to Wale, as well as music festivals such as Taste of Country and Mountain Jam; including performances by The Lumineers, Gary Clark Jr., Phil Lesh & Friends, Primus, and more.

On December 6, 2013, Evntlive was acquired and absorbed by Yahoo!. The site ceased operations and redirected viewers to Yahoo! Music and Yahoo! Screen promptly afterwards.

== Overview ==
EvntLive is an HTML5, web-based platform available on laptops, iPads, and mobile devices. Users must register for a free account on Evntlive’s website in order to reserve tickets and access live and on-demand content. Once they reserve tickets, they can view All Access features from their favorite artists or bands, purchase music, and interact with other online audience members using Buzz. Users can also switch between alternate camera angles as though they are on the concert floor - sharing the experience with their friends online in real-time.

EvntLive was acquired by Yahoo in December 2013

== Artists ==
- Bon Jovi
- Wale
- Escape the Fate
- The Parlotones

=== Taste of Country Music Festival ===
- Trace Adkins
- Willie Nelson
- Justin Moore
- Montgomery Gentry
- Craig Campbell
- Blackberry Smoke
- Gloriana
- Dustin Lynch
- LoCash Cowboys
- Rachel Farley
- Parmalee
- Joe Nichols

=== Mountain Jam Music Festival ===
- The Lumineers
- Primus
- Widespread Panic
- Gov't Mule
- Phil Lesh
- The Avett Brothers
- Dispatch
- Rubblebucket
- Michael Franti
- Jackie Greene
- Deer Tick
- Gary Clark Jr.
- ALO
- The London Souls
- Nicki Bluhm
- Amy Helm
- The Lone Bellow
- The Revivalists
- Swear and Shake
- Roadkill Ghost Choir
- Michael Bernard Fitzgerald

Michele Clark 's Sunset Sessions

- Semi Precious Weapons
- Dale Earnhardt Jr. Jr.

DigiTour Media

- Pentatonix
- Allstar Weekend
- Tyler Ward
