= Virtual sensor network =

Collaborative wireless sensor network

A virtual sensor network (VSN) in computing and telecommunications is an emerging form of collaborative wireless sensor networks. In contrast to early wireless sensor networks that were dedicated to a specific application (e.g., target tracking), VSNs enable multi-purpose, collaborative, and resource efficient WSNs. The key idea difference of VSNs is the collaboration and resource sharing. By doing so nodes achieve application objectives in a more resource efficient way. These networks may further involve dynamically varying subset of sensor nodes (e.g., when the phenomenon migrates sensors that detect the phenomenon changes with time) and/or users (users that are accessing the network changes with time).
A VSN can be formed by providing logical connectivity among collaborative sensors. Nodes can be grouped into different VSNs based on the phenomenon they track (e.g., rock slides vs. animal crossing) or the task they perform. VSNs are expected to provide the protocol support for formation, usage, adaptation, and maintenance of subset of sensors collaborating on a specific task(s). Even the nodes that do not sense the particular event/phenomenon could be part of a VSN as far as they are willing to allow sensing nodes to communicate through them. Thus, VSNs make use of intermediate nodes, networks, or other VSNs to efficiently deliver messages across members of a VSN.

== Applications ==
VSNs are useful in three major classes of applications:

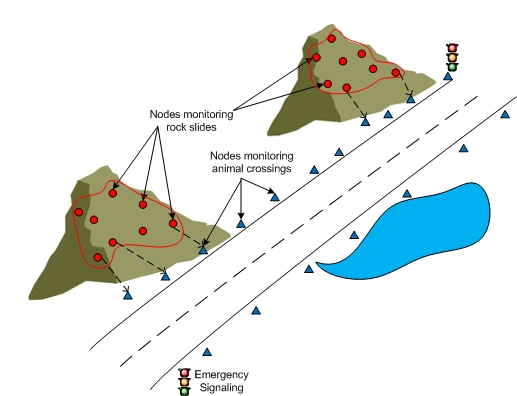
A single WSN is deployed to monitor rock sliding and animal crossing in a mountainous retain (two applications). Each application use nodes from the other application to relay its data to the signaling systems and/or to its members.

- Geographically overlapped applications

- E.g., monitoring rock slides and animal crossing within a mountainous terrain. Different types of devices that detect these phenomena can relay each other for data transfer without having to deploy separate networks. Here the advantage is saving in hardware cost.

- While logically separating multi-purpose sensor networks

- E.g., smart neighborhood systems with multifunctional sensor nodes. Instead of traditional WSNs that runs one single applications, VSN enabled nodes run multiple applications

- In certain dedicated but dynamic applications

- E.g., To enhance efficiency of a system that track dynamic phenomena such as subsurface chemical plumes that migrate, split, or merge. Such networks may involve dynamically varying subsets of sensors. Here the advantage is the ability to connect right set of nodes at the right time.

== See also ==
- Khan, I.; Belqasmi, F.; Glitho, R.; Crespi, N.; Morrow, M.; Polakos, P., "Wireless Sensor Network Virtualization: A Survey," in IEEE Communications Surveys and Tutorials, vol.18, no.1, pp. 553–576, Firstquarter 2016 doi: 10.1109/COMST.2015.2412971
- Khan, I.; Belqasmi, F.; Glitho, R.; Crespi, N.; Morrow, M.; Polakos, P., "Wireless sensor network virtualization: early architecture and research perspectives," in IEEE Network, vol.29, no.3, pp. 104–112, May–June 2015 doi: 10.1109/MNET.2015.7113233
- Khan, I.; Errounda, F.Z.; Yangui, S.; Glitho, R.; Crespi, N., "Getting Virtualized Wireless Sensor Networks' IaaS Ready for PaaS," in Distributed Computing in Sensor Systems (DCOSS), 2015 International Conference on, vol., no., pp. 224–229, 10–12 June 2015 doi: 10.1109/DCOSS.2015.39
- Khan, I.; Jafrin, R.; Errounda, F.Z.; Glitho, R.; Crespi, N.; Morrow, M.; Polakos, P., "A data annotation architecture for semantic applications in virtualized wireless sensor networks," in Integrated Network Management (IM), 2015 IFIP/IEEE International Symposium on, vol., no., pp. 27–35, 11–15 May 2015 doi: 10.1109/INM.2015.7140273
- N. M. Mosharaf Kabir Chowdhurya and Raouf Boutaba, "A survey of network virtualization," Computer Networks, vol. 54, no 5, Apr. 2010, pp 862–876.
- H. M. N. D. Bandara, A. P. Jayasumana, and T. H. Illangasekare, “Cluster tree based self organization of virtual sensor networks,” In Proc. Wireless Mesh and Sensor Networks: Paving the Way to the Future or yet Another...?, New Orleans, Nov. 2008.
- VSN project web page
