= Network Computing Devices =

Defunct Electronics Company

- Industry: Computers
- Founded: 1987; 39 years ago in Mountain View, California, United States
- Founders: Mike Harrigan; Doug Klein; Dave Cornelius; Ed Basart; Martin Eberhard; Kevin Martin
- Defunct: 2004
- Headquarters: Beaverton, Oregon, United States
- Products: Thin clients

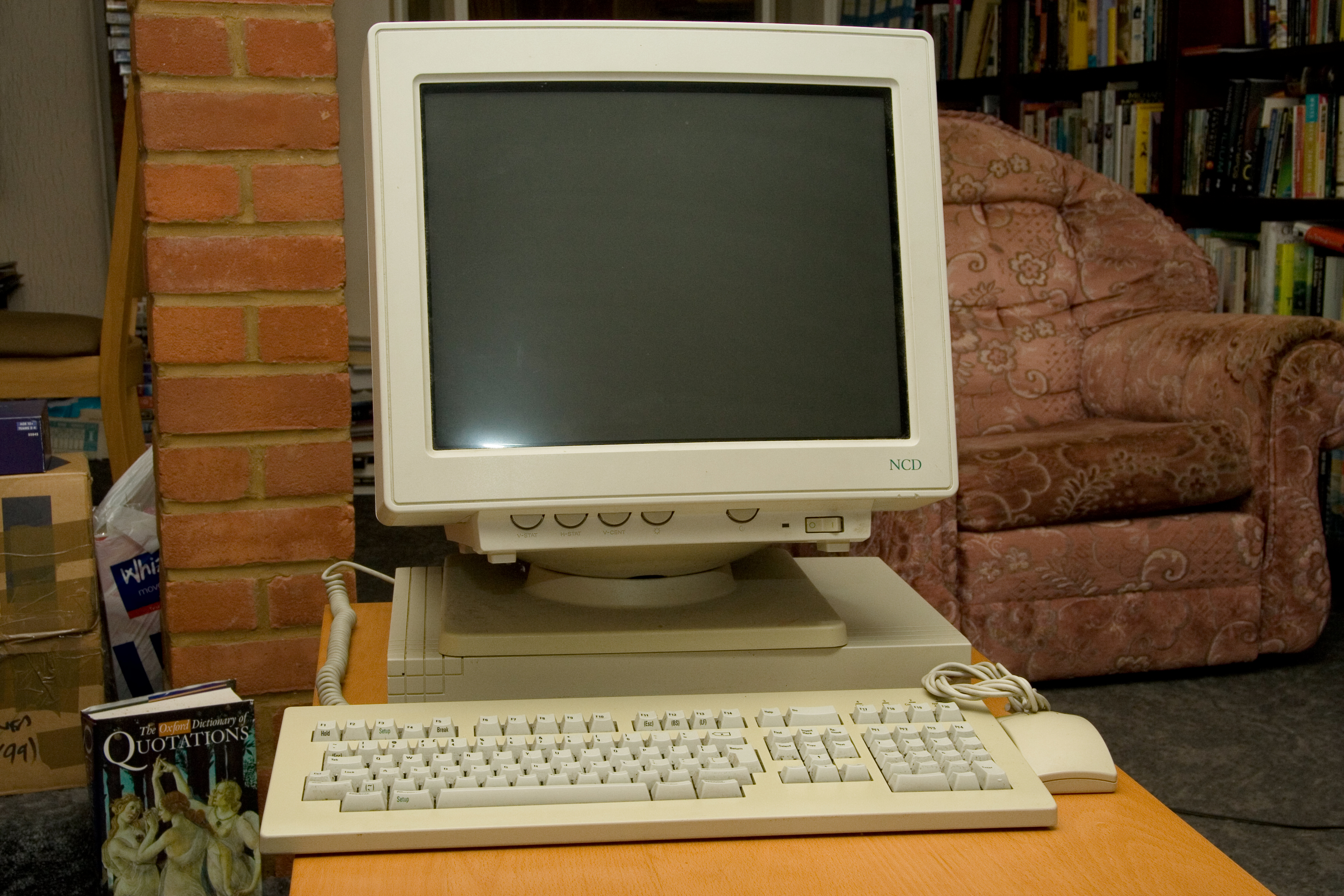
Network Computing Devices NCD-88k X terminal, front view

Network Computing Devices (NCD) was a company founded in 1987 to produce a new class of products now known as a thin client. It was founded in Mountain View, CA, and when it closed it was headquartered in Beaverton, Oregon.

The corporate founders were Mike Harrigan, Doug Klein, Dave Cornelius, Ed Basart, Martin Eberhard, and Kevin Martin.

At that time these devices were known as network terminals or X Terminals. Judith Estrin and William Carrico joined the company about 6 months after its founding as its new CEO and executive vice president, and led the company through its IPO in 1992. The products were some of the earliest examples of a thin client and providing remote access to data in something other than ASCII as was common with traditional terminals of the time.

The X Protocol provided a way to show high-resolution images of data and graphics over a network connection. NCD supported a range of network protocols including TCP/IP, Token Ring, DECnet and others. NCD also developed network-transparent audio system called the Network Audio System (nas) to play, record and manipulate audio over a network.

== Acquisitions ==
NCD purchased PCXware, which made an X Window System for Microsoft Windows.

NCD purchased Z-Code Software in 1994. Z-Code made Z-Mail, a cross platform open standards email client. Z-Mail was later sold by NCD to Netmanage.

NCD purchased TekXPress X-terminals line from Tektronix.

NCD ceased operations in 2004. However, a few of the company's employees have set up a new company, ThinPATH Systems, to provide former NCD customers and others with service, support and products.

== See also ==
- DESQview/X, a similar product
