= Gerald Estrin =

American computer scientist

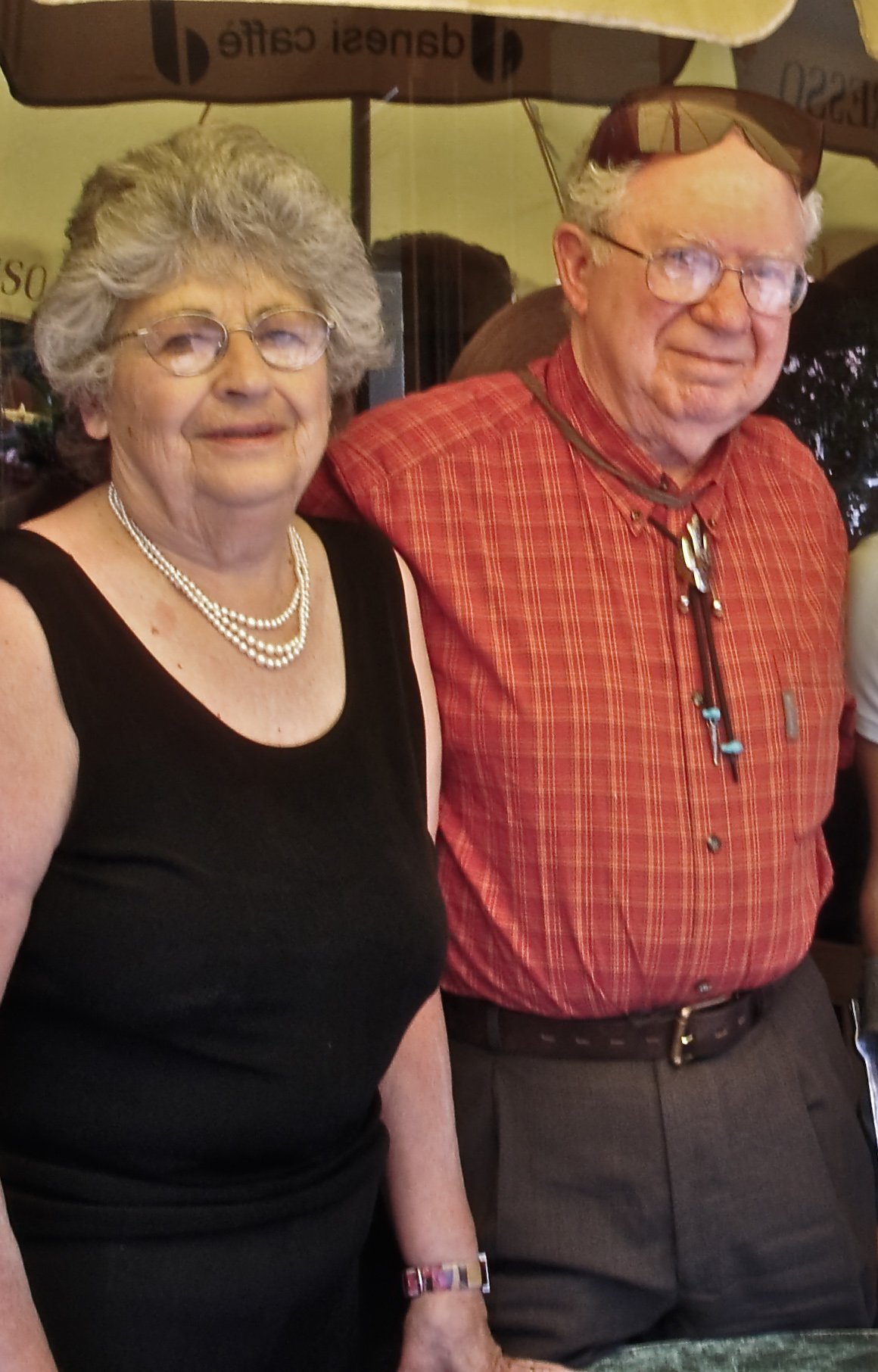
- Gerald Estrin with his wife Thelma. Santa Monica, California. Sept. 2007
- Born: September 9, 1921; New York City, U.S.
- Died: March 29, 2012 (aged 90); Los Angeles, California, U.S.
- Education: University of Wisconsin–Madison (BS, MS, PhD)
- Spouse: Thelma Estrin
- Children: Margo Estrin; Judy Estrin; Deborah Estrin
- Awards: IEEE Life Fellow; Guggenheim Fellowship
- Scientific career
- Fields: Computer science
- Workplaces: Institute for Advanced Study (1950–1956); Weizmann Institute of Science (1954–1955); University of California, Los Angeles (1956–1991)
- Thesis: A Study of Artificial Dielectric Media (Vincent C. Rideout)
- Doctoral students: David Patterson; Jean-Loup Baer; Vint Cerf; Mary K. Vernon; Johanna Moore

Gerald Estrin (September 9, 1921 – March 29, 2012) was an American computer scientist, and professor at the UCLA Computer Science Department. He is known for his work on the organization of computer systems, on parallel processing and SARA (system architects apprentice).

== Early life and education ==
Estrin was born in New York City in 1921. He met his future wife Thelma Austern in 1941 at City College, New York and they were married when he was 20 and she was 17. Estrin entered the Army during World War II, after which he and Thelma Estrin entered the University of Wisconsin-Madison, where they both earned degrees in Electrical Engineering. Estrin received his B.S., M.S., and Ph.D. degrees from the University of Wisconsin in 1948, 1949, and 1951, respectively.

== Institute for Advanced Study ==
Estrin served as research engineer in the von Neumann group at IAS from 1950 to 1956. This led to an invitation from the Weizmann Institute of Science in Israel to direct the WEIZAC Project. Estrin and his wife went to Israel for the WEIZAC Project in 1954, after which Estrin returned to a teaching position at UCLA in 1955.

In the late 1950s Estrin came up with the concept of reconfigurable computing, which allows the acceleration of computational processes by using variable configurations of specialised hardware modules in addition to a sequential processing unit. The idea was practically realised as "The Fixed Plus Variable Structure Computer".

== UCLA ==
Estrin obtained a teaching position at UCLA in 1953 and they moved to Los Angeles. During this time Thelma taught at Los Angeles Valley College, a junior college in Los Angeles. After their return from the WEIZAC project, Thelma also began working at UCLA in 1960 and she became a professor in the Computer Science Department in 1980. Gerald Estrin served as Chairperson of the UCLA Computer Science Department from 1979 to 1982 and from 1985 to 1988. He retired in 1991, and was recalled as professor emeritus.

Estrin was an IEEE Fellow, a Guggenheim Fellow, and a member of the Board of Governors of the Weizmann Institute of Science, Israel.

== Personal life ==
Gerald Estrin had three daughters. Margo Estrin is a medical doctor, Deborah Estrin is a computer scientist and academic professor, and Judith Estrin is a corporate executive.

== Selected publications ==
- Estrin, Gerald. "Organization of computer systems: the fixed plus variable structure computer." Papers presented at the May 3–5, 1960, western joint IRE-AIEE-ACM computer conference. ACM, 1960.
- Estrin, Gerald, et al. "Parallel processing in a restructurable computer system." Electronic Computers, IEEE Transactions on 6 (1963): 747-755.
- Estrin, Gerald, et al. "SARA (system architects apprentice): modeling, analysis, and simulation support for design of concurrent systems." Software Engineering, IEEE Transactions on 2 (1986): 293–311.
