= Deborah Estrin =

American computer scientist

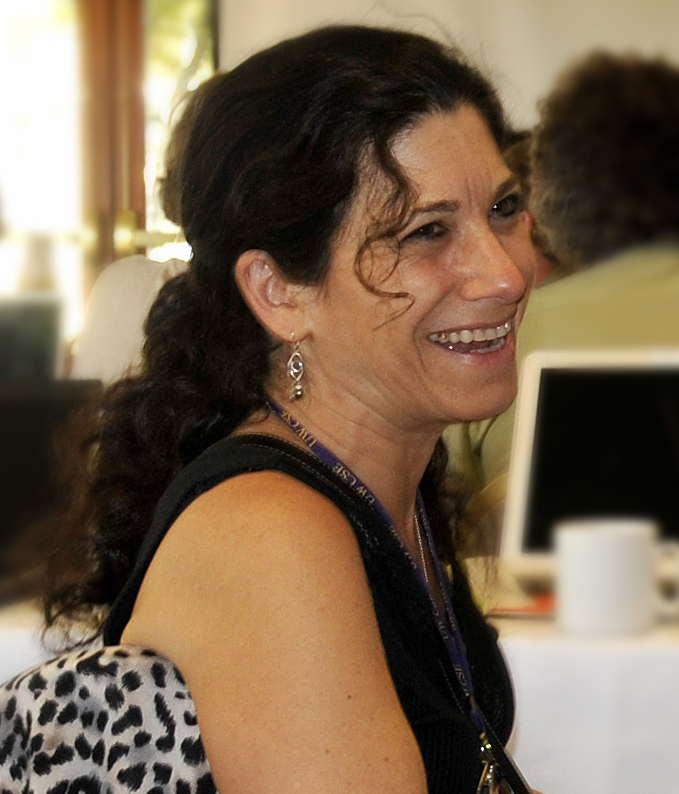
- Born: Deborah Lynn Estrin; December 6, 1959 (age 66)
- Citizenship: United States
- Education: University of California, Berkeley (BS); Massachusetts Institute of Technology (MS, PhD)
- Known for: mobile health, small data, networked sensing
- Scientific career
- Fields: Computer Science
- Workplaces: Cornell Tech
- Doctoral advisor: Jerome H. Saltzer
- Doctoral students: Chalermek Intanagonwiwat, Gene Tsudik, Jeremy Elson, Puneet Sharma

Deborah Estrin (born December 6, 1959) is a professor of Computer Science at Cornell Tech. She is co-founder of the non-profit Open mHealth and gave a TEDMED talk on small data in 2013.

Estrin is known for her work on sensor networks, participatory sensing, mobile health, and small data. She is one of the most-referenced computer scientists of all time, with her work cited over 128,000 times according to Google Scholar.

In 2009, Estrin was elected a member of the National Academy of Engineering for the pioneering design and application of heterogeneous wireless sensing systems for environmental monitoring.

== Career ==
Estrin entered the University of California, Berkeley in 1977, majoring in electrical engineering and computer science (EECS). After graduating from Berkeley with a BS degree in 1980, she moved to the Massachusetts Institute of Technology, where she received her PhD (1985) in EECS under the supervision of Jerry Saltzer. She has also received honorary degrees recognizing her work: a degree honoris causa from EPFL in 2008, and an honorary doctorate degree from Uppsala University, Sweden in 2011.

Estrin was a professor of Computer Science at the University of Southern California between 1986 and 2001, and at the University of California, Los Angeles (UCLA) between 2001 and 2013, where she was the founding director of the NSF-funded Center for Embedded Networked Sensing (CENS). In 2012, Cornell Tech announced Estrin as the first academic hire to the high-tech campus in New York City. At Cornell Tech, Estrin is the Robert V. Tishman '37 Professor of Computer Science. She is also the founder of the Health Tech hub and director of the Small Data Lab, and a member of the Connected Experiences Lab.

Estrin's research has focused on using mobile devices and sensors to collect and analyze data, with applications to health and well-being. Her non-profit startup, Open mHealth, created open data sharing standards and tools that allow developers of health applications to store, process, and visualize data. Her research also explores immersive recommendation systems and the privacy implications of user modeling and data use.

Deborah Estrin in 2009

Estrin has received numerous academic and popular recognitions for her research. She was named one of Popular Science's "Brilliant 10" in 2003. In 2007, she was elected a Fellow of the American Academy of Arts and Sciences, and in 2009 was inducted into the National Academy of Engineering. She is a fellow of the ACM and the IEEE for innovations in scalable network protocols and sensor network research. In 2018 she was elected as a McArthur Fellow for "Designing open-source platforms that leverage mobile devices and data to address socio-technological challenges such as personal health management".

She is the daughter of the late Gerald Estrin, also a UCLA Computer Science professor, and of the late Thelma Estrin, a pioneering engineer and computer scientist also at UCLA. She is the sister of Judy Estrin, and a wife to Ache Stokelman.

== Awards ==
- 1987: National Science Foundation's Presidential Young Investigator Award
- 2007: Anita Borg Institute Women of Vision Award for Innovation
- 2008: Doctor Honoris Causa EPFL
- 2009: National Academy of Engineering
- 2011: Doctor Honoris Causa Uppsala University, Sweden
- 2017: IEEE Internet Award
- 2018: MacArthur Genius Grant
- 2022: IEEE John von Neumann Medal

Estrin is featured in the Notable Women in Computing cards.

== See also ==
- Henry Samueli School of Engineering and Applied Science
