= Micropower =

Micropower describes the use of very small electric generators and prime movers or devices to convert heat or motion to electricity, for use close to the generator. The generator is typically integrated with microelectronic devices and produces "several watts of power or less." These devices offer the promise of a power source for portable electronic devices which is lighter weight and has a longer operating time than batteries.

== Microturbine technology ==
The components of any turbine engine — the gas compressor, the combustion chamber, and the turbine rotor — are fabricated from etched silicon, much like integrated circuits. The technology holds the promise of ten times the operating time of a battery of the same weight as the micropower unit, and similar efficiency to large utility gas turbines. Researchers at Massachusetts Institute of Technology have thus far succeeded in fabricating the parts for such a micro turbine out of six etched and stacked silicon wafers, and are working toward combining them into a functioning engine about the size of a U.S. quarter coin.

Researchers at Georgia Tech have built a micro generator 10 mm wide, which spins a magnet above an array of coils fabricated on a silicon chip. The device spins at 100,000 revolutions per minute, and produces 1.1 watts of electrical power, sufficient to operate a cell phone. Their goal is to produce 20 to 50 watts, sufficient to power a laptop computer.

Scientists at Lehigh University are developing a hydrogen generator on a silicon chip that can convert methanol, diesel, or gasoline into fuel for a microengine or a miniature fuel cell.

Professor Sanjeev Mukerjee of Northeastern University's chemistry department is developing fuel cells for the military that will burn hydrogen to power portable electronic equipment, such as night vision goggles, computers, and communication equipment. In his system, a cartridge of methanol would be used to produce hydrogen to run a small fuel cell for up to 5,000 hours. It would be lighter than rechargeable batteries needed to provide the same power output, with a longer run time. Similar technology could be improved and expanded in future years to power automobiles.

The National Academies' National Research Council recommended in a 2004 report that the U.S. Army should investigate such micropower sources for powering electronic equipment to be carried by soldiers in the future, since batteries sufficient to power the computers, sensors, and communications devices would add considerable weight to the burden of infantry soldiers.

The Future Warrior Concept of the U.S. Army envisions a 2- to 20-watt micro turbine fueled by a liquid hydrocarbon being used to power communications and wearable heating/cooling equipment for up to six days on 10 ounces of fuel.

== Other microgenerator/nanogenerator technologies ==
Professor Orest Symko of the University of Utah physics department and his students developed Thermal Acoustic Piezo Energy Conversion (TAPEC), devices of a cubic inch (16 cubic centimeters), or so, which convert waste heat into acoustic resonance and then into electricity. It would be used to power microelectromechanical systems, or MEMS. The research was funded by the U.S. Army. Symko was to present a paper at the Acoustical Society of America. June 8, 2007. Researchers at MIT developed the first micro-scale piezoelectric energy harvester using thin film PZT in 2005. Arman Hajati and Sang-Gook Kim invented the Ultra Wide-Bandwidth micro-scale piezoelectric energy harvesting device by exploiting the nonlinear stiffness of a doubly clamped microelectromechanical systems (MEMS) resonator. The stretching strain in a doubly clamped beam shows a nonlinear stiffness, which provides a passive feedback and results in amplitude-stiffened Duffing mode resonance.

Professor Zhong Lin Wang of the Georgia Institute of Technology said his team of investigators had developed a "nanometer-scale generator ... based on arrays of vertically aligned zinc oxide nanowires that move inside a "zigzag" plate electrode." Built into shoes, it could generate electricity from walking to power small electronic devices. It could also be powered by blood flow to power biomedical devices. Per an account of the device which appeared in the journal Science, bending of the zinc oxide nanowire arrays produces an electric field by the piezoelectric properties of the material. The semiconductor properties of the device create a Schottky barrier with rectifying capabilities. The generator is estimated to be 17% to 30% efficient in converting mechanical motion into electricity. This could be used to power biomedical devices that have wireless transmission capabilities for data and control. A later development was to grow hundreds of such nanowires on a substrate that functioned as an electrode. On top of this was placed a silicon electrode covered with a series of platinum ridges. Vibration of the top electrode caused the generation of direct current. A report by Wang was to appear in the August 8, 2007 issue of the journal "Nano Letters," saying that such devices could power implantable biomedical devices. The device would be powered by flowing blood or a beating heart. It could function while immersed in body fluids, and would get its energy from ultrasonic vibrations. Wang expects that an array of the devices could produce 4 watts per cubic centimeter. Goals for further development are to increase the efficiency of the array of nanowires, and to increase the lifetime of the device, which as of April 2007 was only about one hour. By November 2010 Wang and his team were able to produce 3 volts of potential and as much as 300 nanoamperes of current, an output level 100 times greater than was possible a year earlier, from an array measuring about 2 cm by 1.5 cm.

The windbelt is a micropower technology invented by Shawn Frayne. It is essentially an aeolian harp, except that it exploits the motion of the string produced by aeroelastic flutter to create a physical oscillation that can be converted to electricity. It avoids the losses inherent in rotating wind powered generators. Prototypes have produced 40 milliwatts in a 16 km/h wind. Magnets on the vibrating membrane generate currents in stationary coils.

Piezoelectric nanofibers in clothing could generate enough electricity from the wearer's body movements to power small electronic devices, such as iPods or some of the electronic equipment used by soldiers on the battlefield, based on research by University of California, Berkeley Professor Liwei Lin and his team. One million such fibers could power an iPod, and would be altogether as large as a grain of sand. Researchers at Stanford University are developing "eTextiles" — batteries made of fabric — that might serve to store power generated by such technology.

Thermal resonator technology allows generation of power from the daily change of temperature, even when there is no instantaneous temperature difference as needed for thermoelectric generation, and no sunlight as needed for photovoltaic generation. A phase change material such as octadecane is selected which can change from solid to liquid when the ambient temperature changes a few degrees Celsius. In a small demonstration device created by chemical engineering professor Michael Strano and seven others at MIT, a 10 degree Celsius daily change produced 350 millivolts and 1.3 milliwatts. The power levels envisioned could power sensors and communication devices.

== See also ==
- Battery (electricity)
- Cell phone
- Conduit hydroelectricity
- Electrical generator
- Electronics
- Fuel cell
- Gas turbine
- Hub dynamo
- Integrated circuits
- Laptop
- Microelectronics
- Microelectromechanical systems
- Nanogenerator
- Portable fuel cell applications
- Vibration-powered generator
- Windbelt
