= Power stealing =

Power stealing may refer to:

- Energy harvesting
- Electricity theft
- Joule thief
- Parasitic load (disambiguation)
- Standby power
