= Safiatou Nana =

Burkinabé solar energy engineer

Safiatou Nana is a Burkinabé renewable solar energy engineer and entrepreneur. She has focused her research and work on producing energy in rural communities through off-grid solar-powered systems. Nana was named one of the "5 African innovators to watch in 2019 and beyond" by One due to her work on a mobile solar powered water pumping system.

== Education ==
Nana gained her BSc in electrical engineering at the Institut International d'Ingénierie de l'Eau et de l'Environnement (2iE) in 2014 before gaining her MSc in Renewable Energy Engineering at The Pan African University Institute of Water and Energy Sciences (including Climate Change) (PAUWES) in 2016.

== Work ==
=== Renewable Energy ===
Safiatou worked as an assistant energy engineer in 2014 with PPS (Project Production Solaire) Sarl. She focused on the design, cost analysis and technical feasibility of off-grid solar energy systems for remote sites. In 2016 Safiatou worked as a junior engineer at the Kwame Nkrumah' University of Science and Technology. She focused on assessment of bio-methane production from waste in order to research utilization of slaughter wastes potential towards energy self-sufficiency. From 2016 to 2017 Safiatou was a community manager for the African Network for Solar Energy - ANSOLE.

Safiatou became the co-founder and Deputy Secretary General of the Youth for Energy Saving organisation in early 2017. This organisation brings together young people and other stakeholders to raise awareness about energy saving in schools, university residences, and other public buildings in Burkina Faso. She left in late 2018.

In May 2018, Nana founded SolarKoodoo and Sun-Taklas Energy, becoming the chief executive officer and managing director of the companies respectively. The start ups are focused on providing renewable energy solutions to rural Burkina Faso with the use of solar energy cells.

=== Fashion ===
Nana is the CEO of Yiri Accessories, a fashion brand that designs, produces, and sells handbags and other accessories made locally with African materials.

=== Blogging ===
Nana runs the blog EnergyIn'Afrik which she launched on 2017. She writes about energy issues within Africa and how research within the continent has contributed to the renewable energy literature. Nana focuses on a range of subjects including solar panels, energy storage, energy efficiency, smart appliances, electric vehicles, energy harvesting, entrepreneurship in the energy sector.

== Awards ==
Nana has been shortlisted for the Africa Prize for Engineering Innovation by the Royal Academy of Engineering. Nana was shortlisted due to her work on SolarKoodo as a movable solar water pumping system that aids farmers to pull water from boreholes in off-grid regions where water tables drop very low whilst also being able to electrify homes.
