= Project Neptune =

Project Neptune may refer to:

- Project Neptune (water distribution system), a British water distribution system
- Project Neptune (National Trust), a project by the National Trust to acquire land on the British coastline
