= Teng =

Teng may refer to:

- Teng (surname) (滕), a Chinese surname
- Teng (state), an ancient Chinese state
- Teng (mythology), a flying dragon in Chinese mythology
- Teng County, a county in Guangxi, China
- Triboelectric nanogenerator, a method of power generation based on charge transfer between dissimilar materials
- Tengwar, ISO 15924 code
