= Project Neptune (water distribution system) =

Project Neptune is a water distribution project in the United Kingdom with the goal of establishing an optimized and more sustainable system for water distribution. The project was officially announced in April 2007, and received a budget of £2.7 million.

In the UK, water service providers (WSPs) are legally obligated to provide drinking water to all of their customers. The difficulty in optimizing this service involves the minimum water pressure and flow standards, as well as the strict regulations regarding water quality. The innovative technologies required to support the goal of Project Neptune are either partially evolved with no proven reliability or do not exist yet. The centre for Sustainable Development at the University of Cambridge is heading the work on integrating artificial intelligence and mathematical simulation technologies to create an efficient online reporting and analyzing system for monitoring performance of the water distribution system.

== Research priority areas ==
In order to address the technological deficiencies of the project, research priority areas (RPA) have been identified by the American Society of Civil Engineers. The RPA three key concentrations include “data and knowledge management, pressure management (including energy management), and the associated complex decision support systems on which to base interventions."

The specific objectives of the RPA are focused on developing communication networks, sustainable technologies, real time information feedback system, and optimal operations. The function of the communication network is to evaluate the performance and reliability of already implemented hardware and sensors for collecting faraway data. In order to achieve a reduction in energy usage, sustainable technologies that develop innovative energy harvesting technology and reduce the necessity for constant battery replacement are necessary for the project.

Real time information relates to acquiring knowledge related to performance of the water distribution system. Optimal operations can be achieved through improvement in understanding and analyzing relevant data, which includes online models of hydraulics. The first round of RPA work is contributing to the initiative headed by Yorkshire Water Services to install the first prototypes of Ground Penetrating Radar Systems (GPRS). The Yorkshire initiative aims to install around 490 prototypes that are connected to sensors that collect pressure and flow data on a half hourly basis.

== Development goals ==
Project Neptune's academic and industrial partners aim to address the tasks of developing: energy saving options, online simulation model to provide an overlook of a full day's water distribution patterns, system to mitigate and manage leakage, automate system adjustments, power harvesting methods, and optimized system for reacting to incidents.

Staff involved in the system controls department of the project have the burden of handling large amounts of data received. The Decision Support System (DSS) was developed in order to alleviate this burden and aid the staff in decision making, prioritizing urgent incidents, and identifying faulty alarms. The DSS functions to combine these strategy and decision making outputs into one single and comprehensive presentation of data for the operator.

== Partners and funding ==
The project today receives funding from the UK's Engineering and Physical Sciences Research Council (EPSRC) in order to further advance understanding and contribute knowledge about optimal and efficient water supply systems.

Industrial funding is also provided for the project, the main contributors include the United Utilities and Yorkshire Water Services. University of Exeter in the UK carries out research for the project in collaboration with seven other research universities located in the UK, including University of Cambridge, the University of Sheffield, Imperial College London, De Montfort University, Lancaster University, University of Leicester, and University of Sheffield.
