= Olsen cycle =

Pyroelectricity

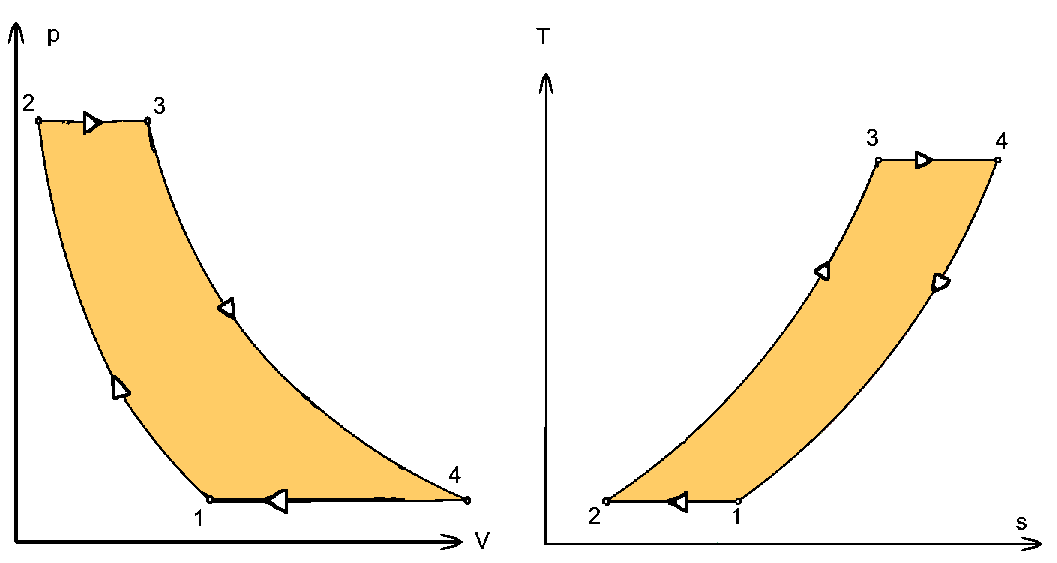
The Ericsson cycle is analogous to the Olsen cycle.

The Olsen cycle is a pyroelectric cycle, which was developed between 1978 and 1986 by Olsen and Bruno, by Olsen and Brown, Olsen and Evans, as well as by Olsen et al. It has been called the Ericsson cycle. However, the Olsen cycle avoids the least confusion with its analogous process of the Ericsson cycle. The Olsen cycle can generate electricity directly from heat when applied to a pyroelectric material, and has been the most favorable method for the generation of electricity from heat using pyroelectric energy harvesting. It consists of two isothermal and two isoelectric field processes in the displacement versus electric field diagram.

It can be compared to the Ericsson cycle, where working fluid undergoes two isothermal and two isobaric processes in a pressure-volume diagram. However, the Ericsson cycle does not include the hysteresis loop, which is essentially a lag between the input of an electric field and the material's output.
