= Wireless powerline sensor =

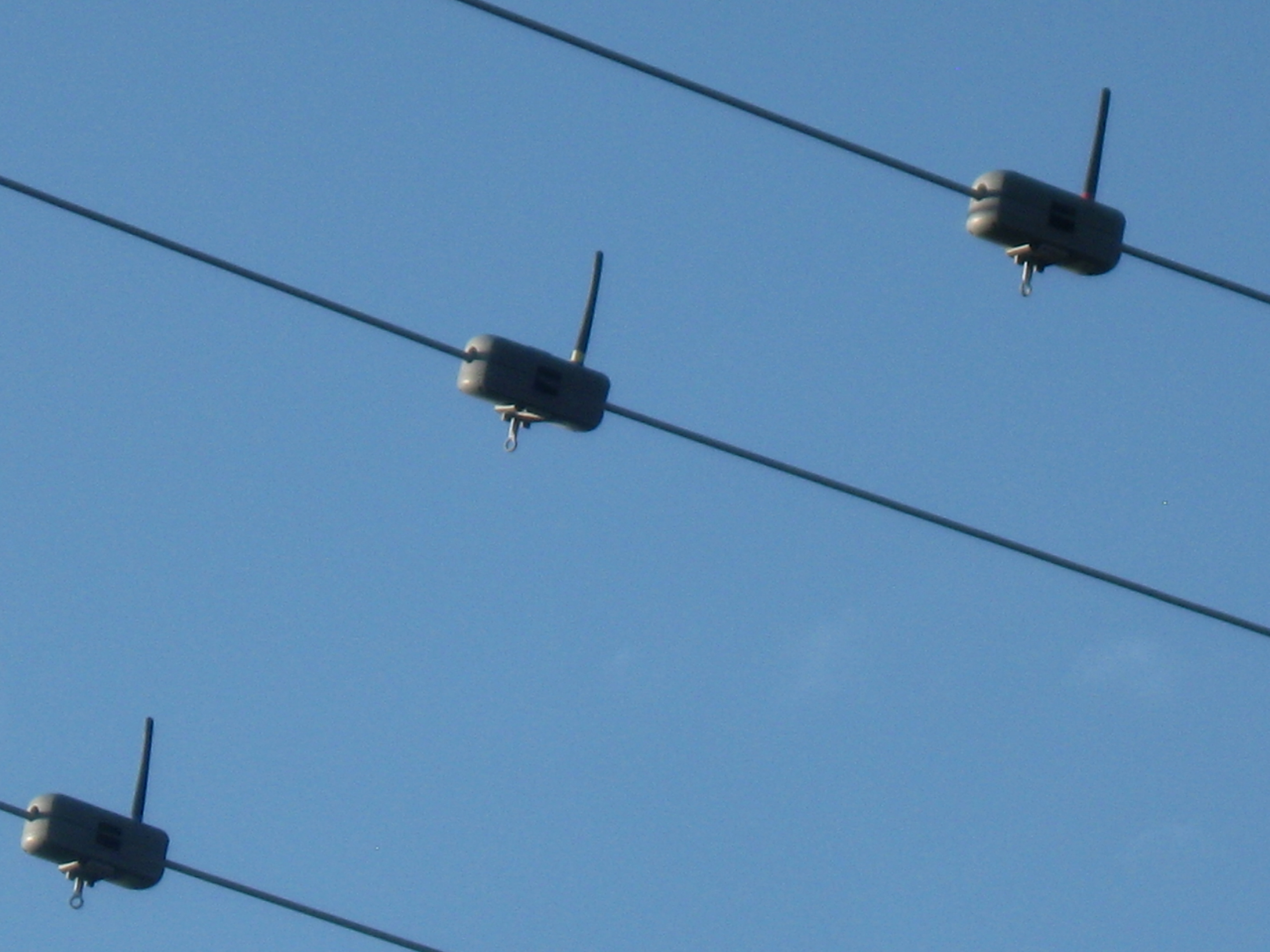
Wireless overhead power line sensors hanging from each of the three phases of a 4160 Volt powerline in a residential neighborhood, in Palo Alto, California

A Wireless powerline sensor hangs from an overhead power line and sends measurements to a data collection system. Because the sensor does not contact anything but a single live conductor, no high-voltage isolation is needed. The sensor, installed simply by clamping it around a conductor, powers itself from energy scavenged from electrical or magnetic fields surrounding the conductor being measured. Overhead power line monitoring helps distribution system operators provide reliable service at optimized cost.

== Communication ==
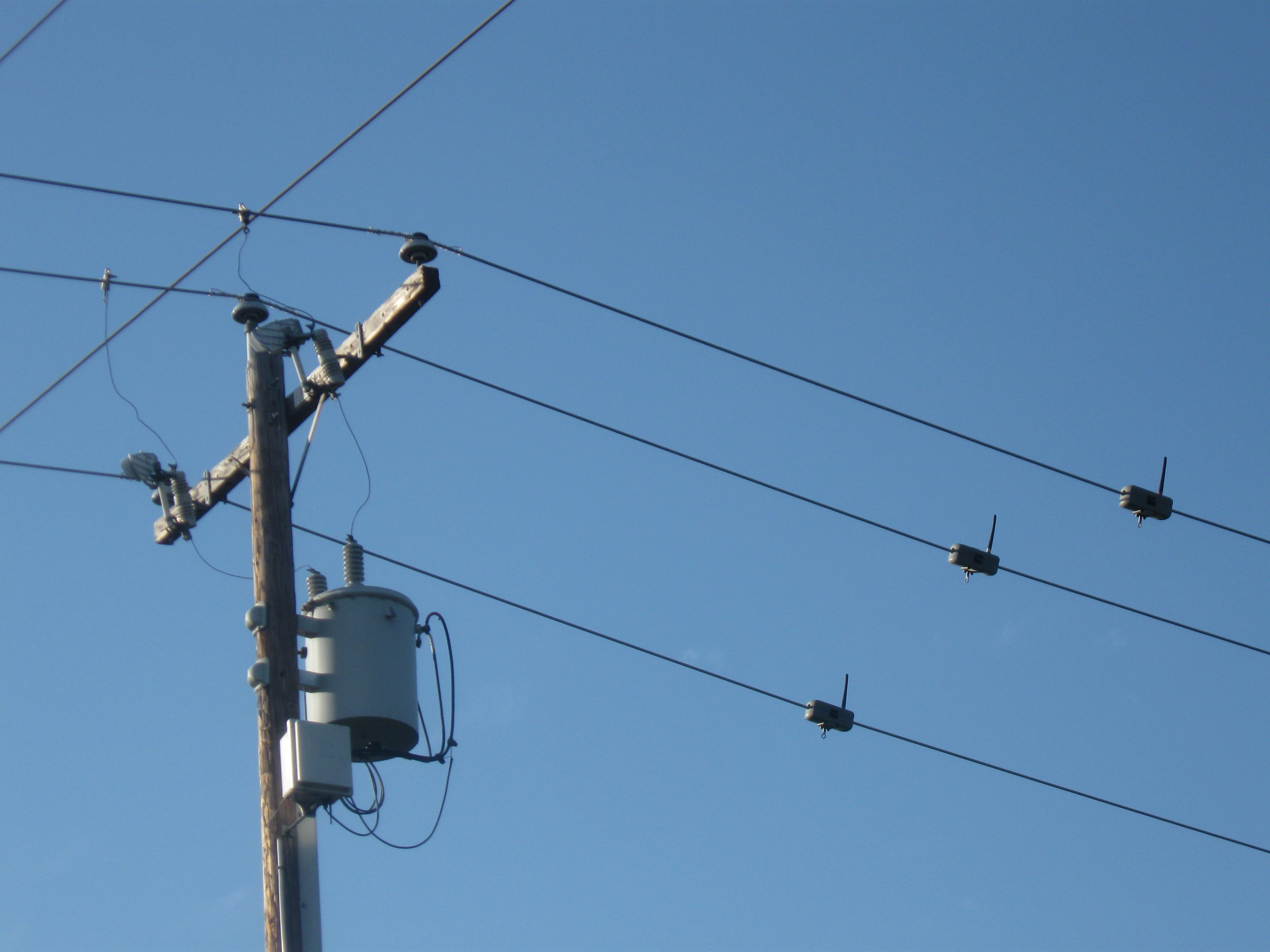
Three powerline sensors hanging on conductors 2 meters to the right of a power pole with a distribution transformer and communication network node

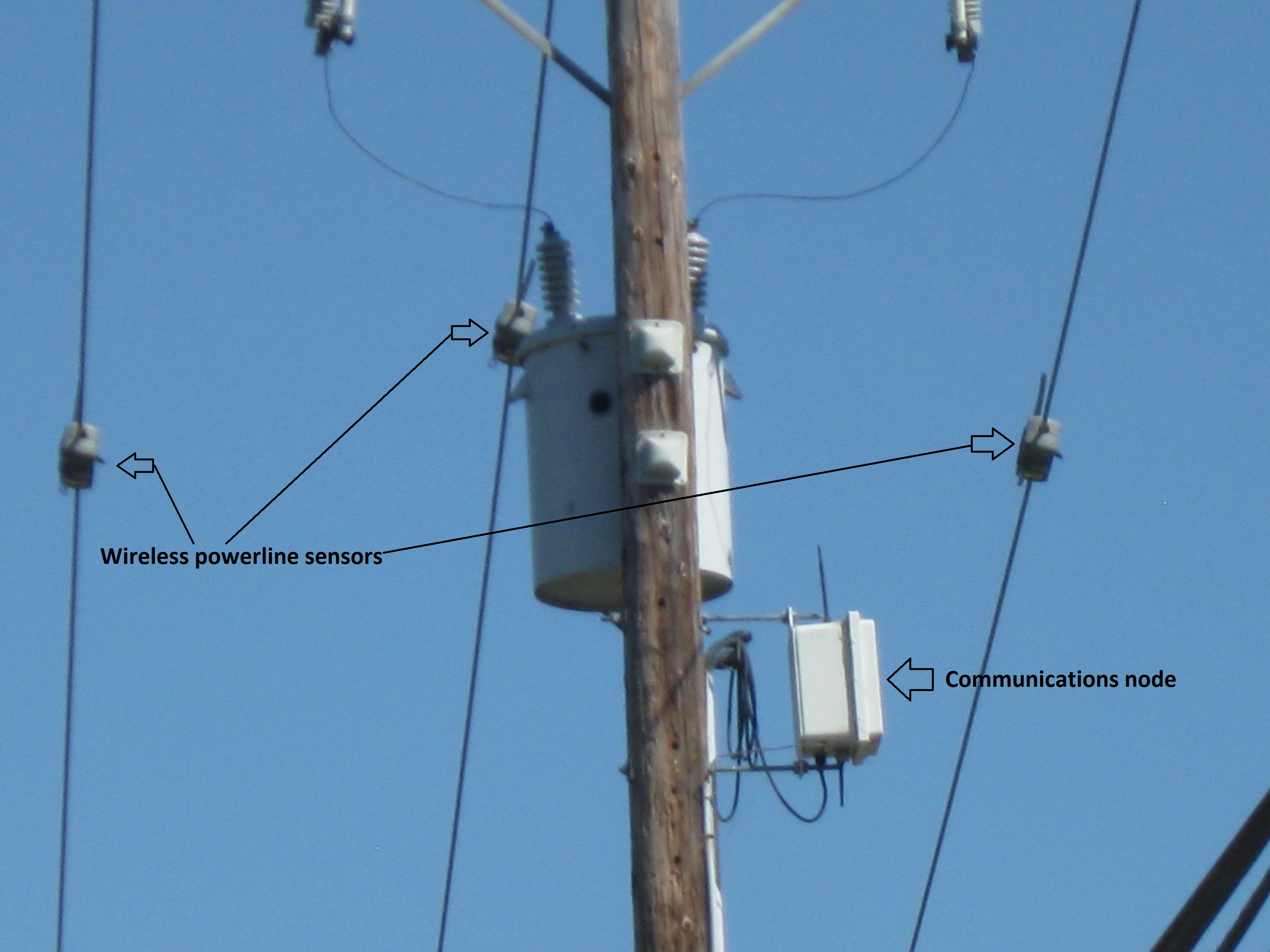
Three wireless overhead powerline sensors hanging from the phases of a 4160 Volt powerline and network node attached to a power pole. The photo also shows an unrelated distribution transformer, which reduces 4160 V to 240/120 V.

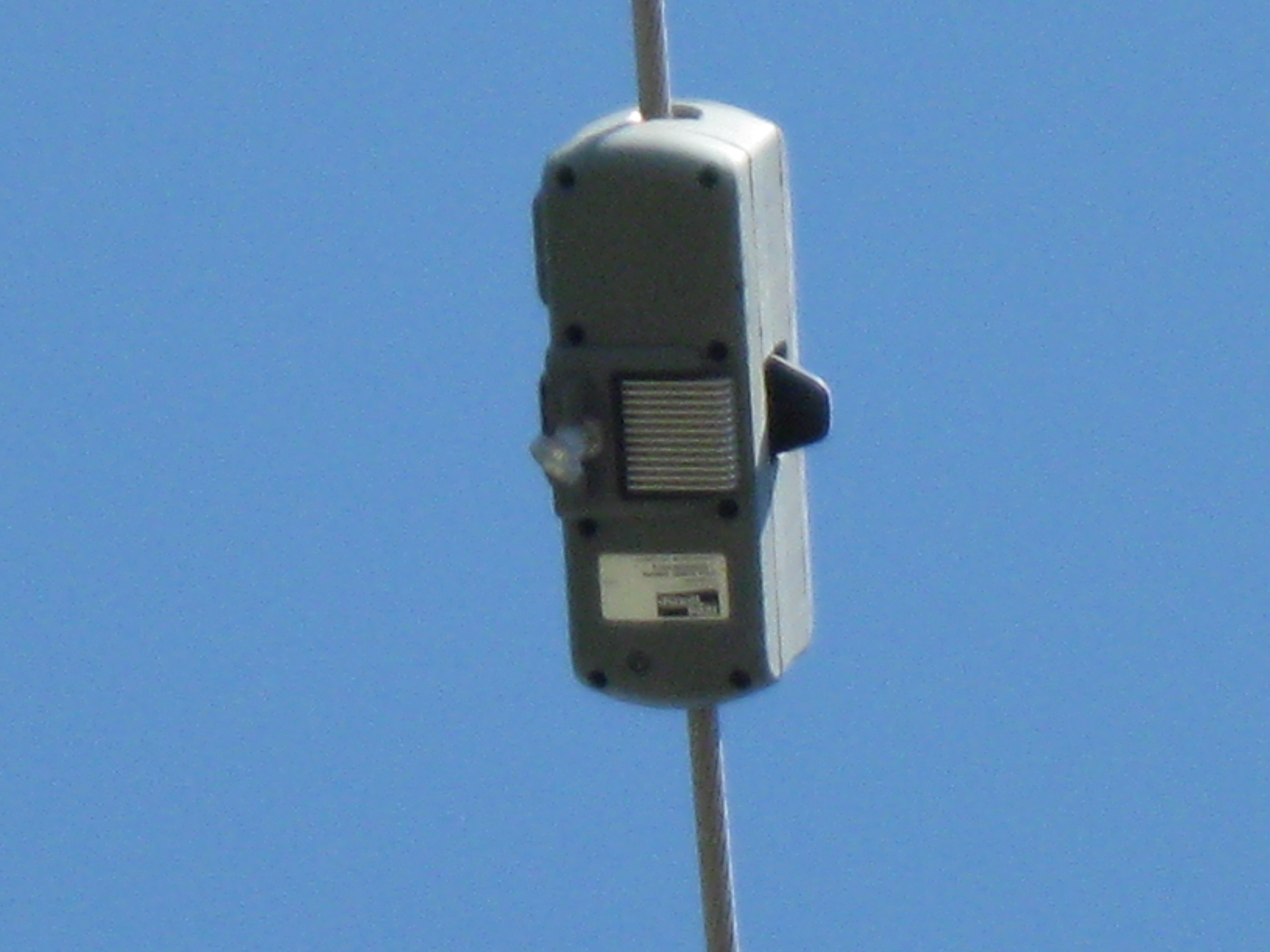
Closeup of overhead powerline sensor hanging from one phase of a 4160 volt powerline

In the photos on the right, an antenna on the sensor transmits data to a communication device attached to a nearby utility pole. The communication device gets power from the 240 volt utility line in a residential neighborhood. The device has two antennas. One antenna collects data from the sensors, and the other antenna forwards the data to the electrical utility control center over cell phone service.

In some systems, powerline sensors may transmit information on the high voltage conductor itself rather than by transmission of a radio signal.

== Measurements ==
The primary purpose of a powerline sensor is to measure current, however, some sensors can either directly measure or derive other data such as:

- Conductor temperature
- Ambient temperature
- Inclination or the amount of line sagging
- Wind movement
- Electric fields
- Power Generation
- Distribution and Consumption of electricity

== See also ==
- Energy management system
- List of wireless sensor nodes
- Sensor node
- Supervisory control and data acquisition
- Wireless sensor network
