= Parasitic load =

Parasitic load or parasitic loss may refer to

- in internal combustion engines, it refers to devices that take energy from the engine in order to enhance the engine's ability to create more energy or convert energy to motion.
- in electricity production, it is any of the loads or devices powered by the generator, not contributing to net electric yield
- in electrical appliances, it represents the power consumed even when the appliance is shut off.
- With regard to railway locomotives, it is any of the loads or devices powered by the prime mover not contributing to tractive effort (such as an air compressor, traction motor blower, or radiator fans).

== See also ==
- Energy harvesting
- Power stealing (disambiguation)
