= Windbelt =

Wind power harvesting device

The Windbelt is a wind power harvesting device invented by Shawn Frayne in 2004 for converting wind power to electricity. It consists of a flexible polymer ribbon stretched between supports transverse to the wind direction, with magnets glued to it. When the wind blows across it, the ribbon vibrates due to vortex shedding, similar to the action of an aeolian harp. The vibrating movement of the magnets induces current in nearby pickup coils by electromagnetic induction.

One prototype has powered two LEDs, a radio, and a clock (separately) using wind generated from a household fan. The cost of the materials was well under US$10. $2–$5 for 40 mW is a cost of $50–$125 per watt.

There are three sizes in development:

- The microBelt, a 12 cm version. This could be put into production in around six months. Its expected to produce 1 milliwatt average. To charge a pair of ideal rechargeable AA cells (2.5Ah 1.2v) this would take 6000 hours, or 250 days.
- The Windcell, a 1-metre version that could be used to power meshed WiFi repeaters, charge cellphones, or run LED lights. This could go into production within 18 to 24 months. It is hoped that a square metre panel at 6 m/s average windspeed can generate 10 W average.
- An experimental 10-metre model that has no production date.

The Windbelt's inventor, Shawn Frayne, was a winner of the 2007 Breakthrough Award from the publishers of the magazine, Popular Mechanics. He is trying to make the Windbelt cheaper.

The inventor's claims that the device is 10–30 times more efficient than small wind turbines have been refuted by tests. The microWindbelt could generate 0.2 mW at a wind speed of 3.5 m/s and 5 mW at 7.5 m/s, which represent efficiencies (ηC_{p}) of 0.21 and 0.53 respectively. Wind turbines typically have efficiencies of 1% to 10%. Since the Windbelt a number of other "flutter" wind harvester devices have been designed, but like the Windbelt almost all have efficiencies below turbine machines.
