= Vibration-powered generator =

Type of electric generator

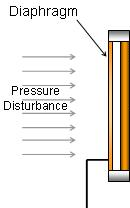
A transducer made of a piezoelectric diaphragm being disturbed by a sound pressure wave.

A vibration powered generator is a type of electric generator that converts the kinetic energy from vibration into electrical energy. The vibration may be from sound pressure waves or other ambient vibrations.

Vibration powered generators usually consist of a resonator which is used to amplify the vibration source, and a transducer mechanism which converts the energy from the vibrations into electrical energy. The transducer usually consists of a magnet and coil or a piezoelectric crystal.

== Electromagnetic generators ==
Electromagnetic based generators use Faraday's law of induction to convert the kinetic energy of the vibrations into electrical energy. They consist of magnets attached to a flexible membrane or cantilever beam and a coil. The vibrations cause the distance between the magnet and coil to change, causing a change in magnetic flux and resulting in an electromagnetic force being produced. Generally, the coil is made using a diamagnetic material as these materials have weaker interactions with the magnet that would dampen the vibration. The main advantage of this type of generator is that it is able to produce more power than the piezoelectric generators. Electromagnetic based vibration-powered generators have been commercialized.

=== Development and applications ===
A miniature electromagnetic vibration energy generator was developed by a team from the University of Southampton in 2007. This particular device consists of a cantilever beam with a magnet attached to the end. The beam moves up and down as the device is subjected to vibrations from surrounding sources. This device allows sensors in hard-to-access locations to be powered without electrical wires or batteries that need to be replaced. Sensors in inaccessible places can now generate their own power and transmit data to outside receivers. The generator was developed to be used in air compressors, and is able to power things in high vibration environments like sensors on machinery in manufacturing plants, or sensors that monitor the health of bridges. One of the major limitations of the magnetic vibration energy harvester developed at the University of Southampton is the size of the generator. At approximately one cubic centimeter, this device would be much too large to be used in modern electronic devices. Future improvements on the size of the device could make it an ideal power source for medically implanted devices such as pacemakers. According to the team that created the device, the vibrations from the heart muscles would be enough to allow the generator to power a pacemaker. This would eliminate the need to replace the batteries surgically.

In 2012 a group at Northwestern University developed a vibration-powered generator out of polymer in the form of a spring. This device was able to harvest the energy from vibrations at the same frequencies as the University of Southampton groups cantilever based device but at approximately one third the size of the other device.

== Piezoelectric generators ==
Piezoelectric based generators use thin membranes or cantilever beams made of piezoelectric crystals as a transducer mechanism. When the crystal is put under strain by the kinetic energy of the vibration a small amount of current is produced thanks to the piezoelectric effect. These mechanisms are usually very simple with few moving parts, and they tend to have a very long service life. This makes them the most popular method of harvesting the energy from vibrations. These mechanisms can be manufactured using the MEMS fabrication process, which allows them to be created on a very small scale. The ability to make piezoelectric generators on such a small scale is the main advantage of this method over the electromagnetic generators, especially when the generator is being developed to power microelectronic devices. Piezoelectric vibration generator has been commercialized.

=== Development and applications ===
One piezoelectric generator being developed uses water droplets at the end of a piezoelectric cantilever beam. The water droplets hang from the end of the beam and are subjected to excitation by the kinetic energy of the vibrations. This results in the water droplet oscillating, which in turn causes the beam they are hanging from to deflect up and down. This deflection is the strain which is converted to energy through the piezoelectric effect. A major advantage to this method is that it can be tailored towards a wide range of excitation frequencies. The natural frequency of the water droplet is a function of its size; therefore changing the size of the water droplet allows for the matching of the natural frequency of the droplet and the frequency of the pressure wave being converted into electrical energy. Matching these frequencies produces the largest amplitude oscillation of the water droplet, resulting in a large force and larger strain on the piezoelectric beam.

Another application seeks to use the vibrations created during flight in aircraft to power the electronics on the plane that currently rely on batteries. Such a system would allow for a reliable energy source, and reduce maintenance as batteries would no longer need to be replaced and piezoelectric systems have a long service life. This system is used with a resonator, which allows the airflow to form a high amplitude steady tone. The same principle is used in many wind instruments, converting the airflow provided by the musician into a loud steady tone. This tone is used as the vibration that is converted from kinetic to electric energy by the piezoelectric generator. This application is still in the early stages of development; the concept has been proven on a scale model but the system still needs to be optimized before it is tested on a full scale.

== See also ==
- Automatic watch
