= Nanogenerator =

Small electrical generator

A nanogenerator is a compact device that converts mechanical or thermal energy into electricity, serving to harvest energy for small, wireless autonomous devices. It uses ambient energy sources like solar, wind, thermal differentials, and kinetic energy. Nanogenerators can use ambient background energy in the environment, such as temperature gradients from machinery operation, electromagnetic energy, or even vibrations from motions.

Energy harvesting from the environment has a very long history, dating back to early devices such as watermills, windmills and later hydroelectric plants. More recently there has been interest in smaller systems. While there was some work in the 1980s on implantable piezoelectric devices, more devices were developed in the 1990s including ones based upon the piezoelectric effect, electrostatic forces, thermoelectric effect and electromagnetic induction—see Beeby et al for a 2006 review. Very early on it was recognized that these could use energy sources such as from walking in shoes, and could have important medical applications, be used for in vivo MEMS devices or be used to power wearable computing. Many more recent systems have built onto this work, for instance triboelectric generators, bistable systems, pyroelectric materials and continuing work on piezoelectric systems as well as those described in more general overviews including applications in wireless electronic devices and other areas.

There are three classes of nanogenerators: piezoelectric, triboelectric, both of which convert mechanical energy into electricity, and pyroelectric nanogenerators, which convert heat energy into electricity.

== Piezoelectric nanogenerator ==
A piezoelectric nanogenerator is an energy-harvesting device capable of converting external kinetic energy into electrical energy via action by a nano-structured piezoelectric material. It is generally used to indicate kinetic energy harvesting devices utilizing nano-scaled piezoelectric material, like in thin-film bulk acoustic resonators.

=== Mechanism ===
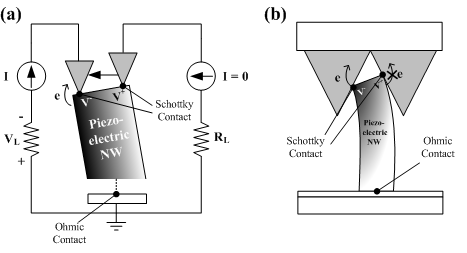
Working principle of nanogenerator where an individual nanowire is subjected to the force exerted perpendicular to the growing direction of nanowire. (a) An AFT tip is swept through the tip of the nanowire. Only negatively charged portion will allow the current to flow through the interface. (b) The nanowire is integrated with the counter electrode with AFT tip-like grating. As of (a), the electrons are transported from the compressed portion of nanowire to the counter electrode because of Schottky contact.

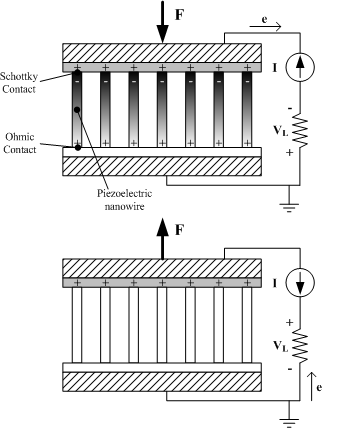
Working principle of nanogenerator where an individual nanowire is subjected to the force exerted parallel to the growing direction of nanowire

The working principle of the nanogenerator will be explained in two different cases: the force exerted perpendicular to and parallel to the axis of the nanowire. When a piezoelectric structure is subjected to the external force of the moving tip, deformation occurs throughout the structure. The piezoelectric effect will create an electrical field inside the nanostructure; the stretched part with the positive strain will exhibit positive electrical potential, whereas the compressed part with negative strain will show the negative electrical potential. This is due to the relative displacement of cations with respect to anions in their crystalline structure. As a result, the tip of the nanowire will have an electrical potential distribution on its surface, while the bottom of the nanowire is neutralized since it is grounded. The maximum voltage generated in the nanowire can be calculated using the following equation:

$V_{\text{max}} = \pm \frac{3}{4(\kappa_0+\kappa)}[e_{\text{33}} - 2(1 + \nu) e_{\text{15}} - 2\nu e_{\text{31}}] \frac{a^3}{l^3} \nu_{\text{max}}$,

where κ_{0} is the permittivity in vacuum, κ is the dielectric constant, e_{33}, e15, and e_{31} are the piezoelectric coefficients, ν is the Poisson ratio, a is the radius of the nanowire, l is the length of the nanowire, and ν_{max} is the maximum deflection of the nanowire's tip.

The Schottky contact must be formed between the counter electrode and the tip of the nanowire since the ohmic contact will neutralize the electrical field generated at the tip. ZnO nanowire with an electron affinity of 4.5 eV, Pt (φ = 6.1 eV), is a metal sometimes used to construct the Schottky contact. By constructing the Schottky contact, the electrons will pass to the counter electrode from the surface of the tip when the counter electrode is in contact with the regions of the negative potential, whereas no current will be generated when it is in contact with the regions of the positive potential, in the case of the n-type semiconductive nanostructure (the p-type semiconductive structure will exhibit the reversed phenomenon since the hole is mobile in this case).

For the second case, a model with a vertically grown nanowire stacked between the ohmic contact at its bottom and the Schottky contact at its top is considered. When the force is applied toward the tip of the nanowire, the uniaxial compressive force is generated in the nanowire. Due to the piezoelectric effect, the tip of the nanowire will have a negative piezoelectric potential, increasing the Fermi level at the tip. Since the electrons will then flow from the tip to the bottom through the external circuit, positive electrical potential will be generated at the tip. The Schottky contact will stop electrons from being transported through the interface, therefore maintaining the potential at the tip. As the force is removed, the piezoelectric effect diminishes, and the electrons will be flowing back to the top in order to neutralize the positive potential at the tip. The second case will generate an alternating-current output signal.

=== Geometrical configuration ===
Depending on the configuration of the piezoelectric nanostructure, the nanogenerator can be categorized into 3 types: VING, LING, and NEG.

==== Vertical nanowire Integrated Nanogenerator (VING) ====
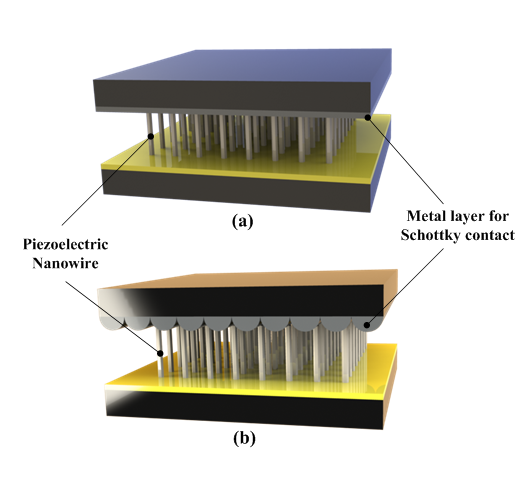
A schematic view of a typical Vertical nanowire Integrated Nanogenerator, (a) with full contact, and (b) with partial contact.

VING is a 3-dimensional configuration consisting of a stack of 3 layers, which are the base electrode, the vertically grown piezoelectric nanostructure, and the counter electrode. The piezoelectric nanostructure is usually grown on the base electrode, which is then integrated with the counter electrode in full or partial mechanical contact with its tip.

The first VING was developed in 2007 with a counter electrode with the periodic surface grating resembling the arrays of the AFM tip as a moving electrode. Since the counter electrode is not in full contact with the tips of the piezoelectric nanowire, its motion in-plane or out-of-plane caused by the external vibration induces the deformation of the piezoelectric nanostructure, leading to the generation of the electrical potential distribution inside each individual nanowire. The counter electrode is coated with metal, forming a Schottky contact with the tip of the nanowire. Zhong Lin Wang's group has generated counter electrodes composed of ZnO nanorods. Sang-Woo Kim's group at Sungkyunkwan University (SKKU) and Jae-Young Choi's group at Samsung Advanced Institute of Technology (SAIT) introduced a bowl-shaped transparent counter electrode by combining anodized aluminum and electroplating technology. They have also developed the other type of counter electrode by using networked single-walled carbon nanotube (SWNT).

==== Lateral nanowire Integrated Nanogenerator (LING) ====
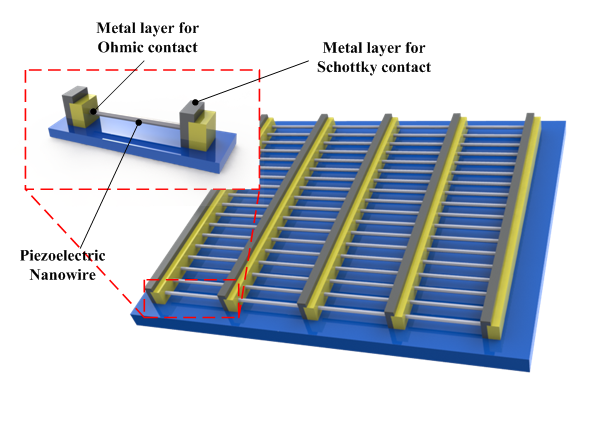
A schematic view of a typical Lateral nanowire Integrated Nanogenerator

LING is a 2-dimensional configuration consisting of three parts: the base electrode, the laterally grown piezoelectric nanostructure, and the metal electrode for schottky contact. In most cases, the thickness of the substrate film is thicker than the diameter of the piezoelectric nanostructure. LING is an expansion of the single wire generator (SWG).

==== Nanocomposite Electrical Generators (NEG) ====
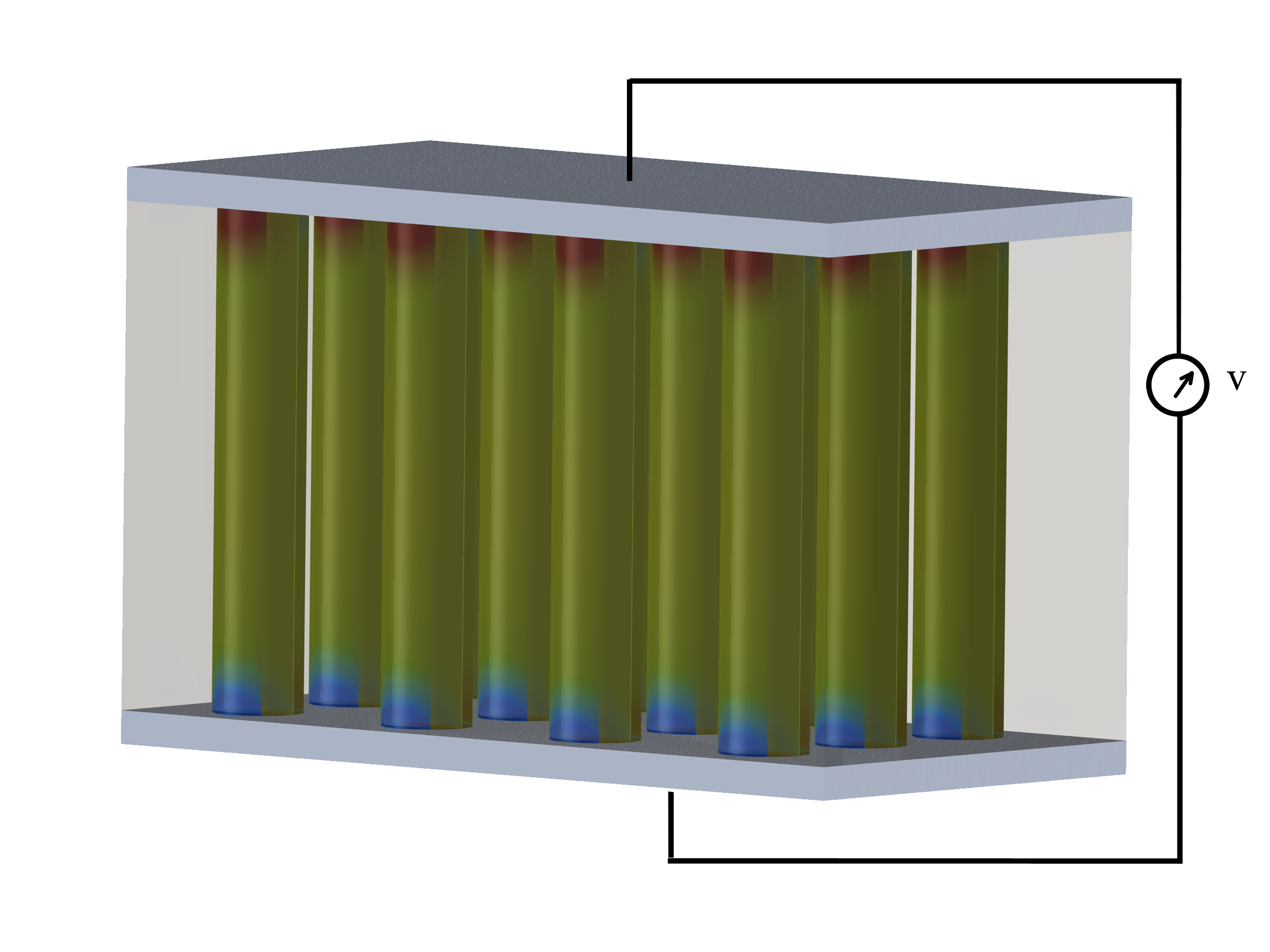
A schematic view of a typical Nanocomposite Electrical Generator

NEG is a 3-dimensional configuration consisting of three main parts: the metal plate electrodes, the vertically grown piezoelectric nanostructure, and the polymer matrix, which fills in between the piezoelectric nanostructure. NEG was introduced by Momeni et al. A fabric-like geometrical configuration has been suggested where a piezoelectric nanowire is grown vertically on the two microfibers in their radial direction, and they are twined to form a nanogenerator. One of the microfibers is coated with the metal to form a Schottky contact, serving as the counter electrode for VINGs.

=== Materials ===
Among the various piezoelectric materials studied for the nanogenerator, much of the research has focused on materials with a wurtzite structure, such as ZnO, CdS and GaN. Zhong Lin Wang of the Georgia Institute of Technology introduced p-type ZnO nanowires. Unlike the n-type semiconductive nanostructure, the mobile particle in the p-type is a hole, thus, the schottky behavior is reversed from that of the n-type case; the electrical signal is generated from the portion of the nanostructure where the holes are accumulated.

From the idea that the material with a perovskite structure is known to have more effective piezoelectric characteristics compared to that with a wurtzite structure, barium titanate nanowire has also been studied by Min-Feng Yu of the University of Illinois at Urbana-Champaign. The output signal was found to be more than 16 times that of a similar ZnO nanowire. Liwei Lin of the University of California, Berkeley, has suggested that PVDF can also be applied to form a nanogenerator.

A comparison of the reported materials as of 2010 is given in the following table:

Material	Type	Geometry	Output voltage	Output power	Synthesis	Researched at
ZnO (n-type)	Wurtzite	D: ~100 nm, L: 200~500 nm	V_{P}=~9 mV @ R=500 MΩ	~0.5 pW per cycle (estimated)	CVD, hydrothermal process	Georgia Tech.
ZnO (p-type)	Wurtzite	D: ~50 nm, L: ~600 nm	V_{P}=50~90 mV @ R=500 MΩ	5~16.2 pW per cycle (calculated)	CVD	Georgia Tech.
ZnO-ZnS	Wurtzite (Heterostructure)	Not stated	V_{P}=~6 mV @ R=500 MΩ	~0.1 pW per cycle (calculated)	Thermal evaporation and etching	Georgia Tech.
GaN	Wurtzite	D: 25~70 nm, L: 10~20 μm	V_{avg}=~20 mV, V_{max}=~0.35 V@ R=500 MΩ	~0.8 pW per cycle (average, calculated)	CVD	Georgia Tech.
CdS	Wurtzite	D: ~100 nm, L: 1 μm	V_{P}=~3 mV	Not stated	PVD, Hydrothermal Process	Georgia Tech.
BaTiO_{3}	Perovskite	D: ~280 nm, L: ~15 μm	V_{P}=~25 mV @ R=100 MΩ	~0.3 aJ per cycle (stated)	High temperature chemical reaction	UIUC
PVDF	Polymer	D: 0.5~6.5 μm, L: 0.1~0.6 mm	V_{P}=5~30 mV	2.5 pW~90 pW per cycle (calculated)	Electro spinning	UC Berkeley
KNbO_{3}	Perovskite	D: ~100 nm; L: few cm	Vp = ~16 V @ R=100 MΩ		Electro spinning	SUTD/MIT

=== Applications ===
In 2010, the Zhong Lin Wang group developed a self-powered pH or UV sensor integrated with VING with an output voltage of 20–40 mV on the sensor. Zhong Lin Wang's group has also generated an alternating current voltage of up to 100 mV from the flexible SWG attached to a device for running hamster.

Some of the piezoelectric nanostructure can be formed on various kinds of substrates, such as transparent organic substrates. The research groups in SKKU (Sang-Woo Kim's group) and SAIT (Jae-Young Choi's group) have developed a transparent and flexible nanogenerator. Their research substituted an indium-tin-oxide (ITO) electrode with a graphene layer.

== Triboelectric nanogenerator ==
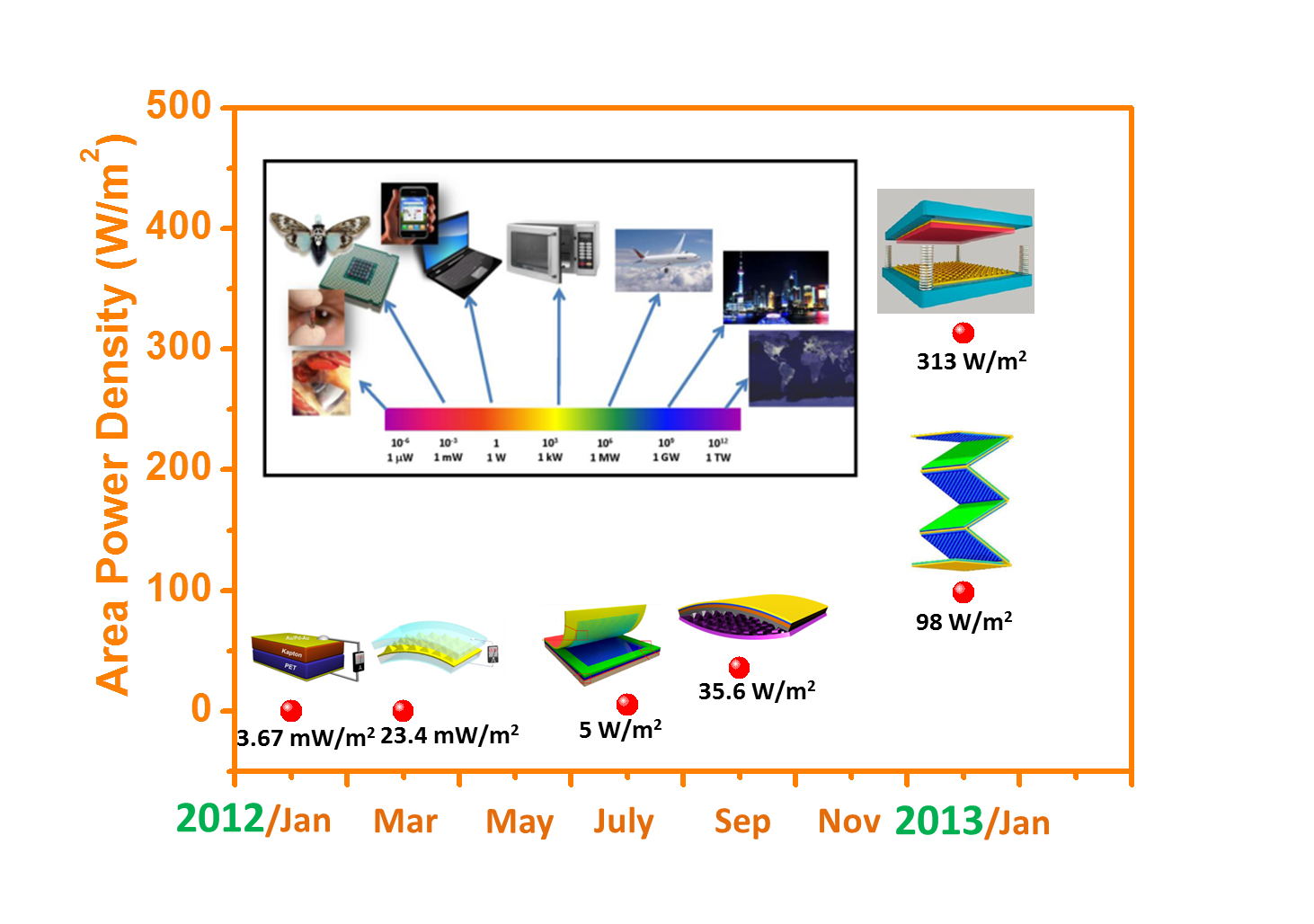
A summary on the progress made in the output power density of triboelectric nanogenerators within 12 months.

A triboelectric nanogenerator is an energy-harvesting device that converts mechanical energy into electricity using the triboelectric effect. They were first demonstrated by Zhong Lin Wang's group at the Georgia Institute of Technology in 2012.

Ever since the first report of the TENG in January 2012, the output power density of the TENG has improved, reaching 313 W/m^{2}, the volume density reaches 490 kW/m^{3}, and conversion efficiencies of ~60%–72% have been demonstrated. Ramakrishna Podila's group at Clemson University also demonstrated the first truly wireless triboelectric nanogenerators, which were able to charge energy storage devices (e.g., batteries and capacitors) without the need for any external amplification or boosters.

=== Basic modes and mechanisms ===
The triboelectric nanogenerator has three basic operation modes: vertical contact-separation mode, in-plane sliding mode, and single-electrode mode. They have different characteristics and are suitable for different applications.

==== Vertical contact-separation mode ====
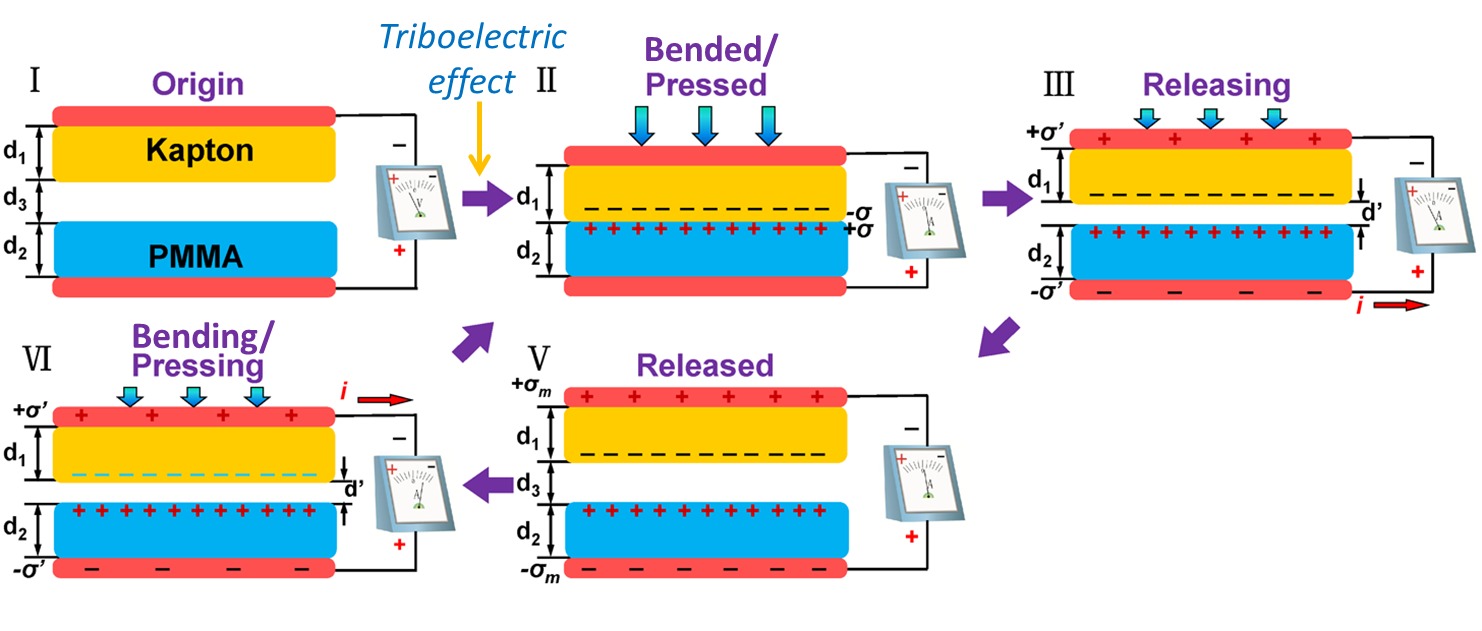
Vertical contact-separation mode of a triboelectric nanogenerator

The periodic change in the potential difference induced by the cycled separation and re-contact of the opposite triboelectric charges on the inner surfaces of the two sheets. When mechanical agitation is applied to the device to bend or press it, the inner surfaces will come into close contact, leaving one side of the surface with positive charges and the other with negative charges.

When the deformation is released, the two surfaces with opposite charges will separate automatically, so that these opposite triboelectric charges will generate an electric field and induce a potential difference across the top and bottom electrodes. The electrons will flow from one electrode to the other through the external load. The electricity generated in this process will continue until the potentials of the two electrodes are the same. Subsequently, when the two sheets are pressed towards each other again, the triboelectric-charge-induced potential difference will begin to decrease to zero, so that the transferred charges will flow back through the external load to generate another current pulse in the opposite direction.

When this periodic mechanical deformation lasts, the alternating current signals will be continuously generated. As for the pair of materials getting into contact and generating triboelectric charges, at least one of them needs to be an insulator so that the triboelectric charges cannot be conducted away but will remain on the inner surface of the sheet.

==== Lateral sliding mode ====
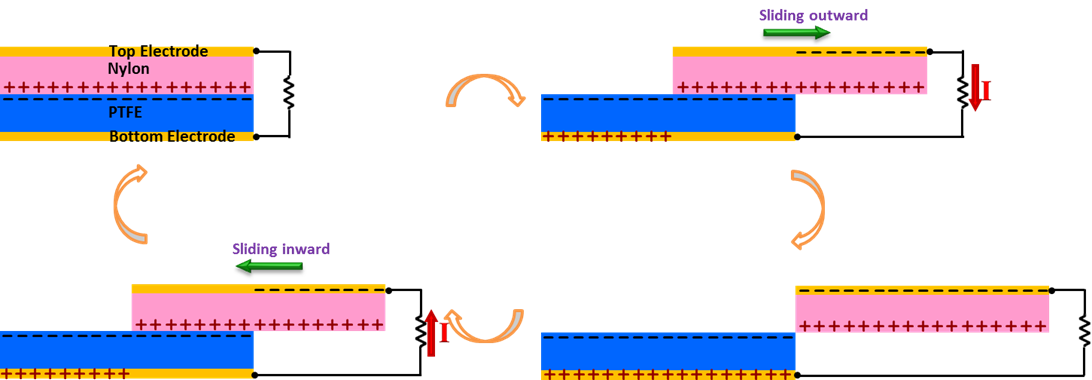
Lateral sliding mode of triboelectric nanogenerator

There are two basic friction processes: normal contact and lateral sliding. One TENG is designed based on the in-plane sliding between the two surfaces in a lateral direction. With triboelectrification from sliding, a periodic change in the contact area between two surfaces leads to a lateral separation of the charge centers, which creates a voltage driving the flow of electrons in the external load. The mechanism of in-plane charge separation can work in either one-directional sliding between two plates or in rotation mode.

==== Single-electrode mode ====
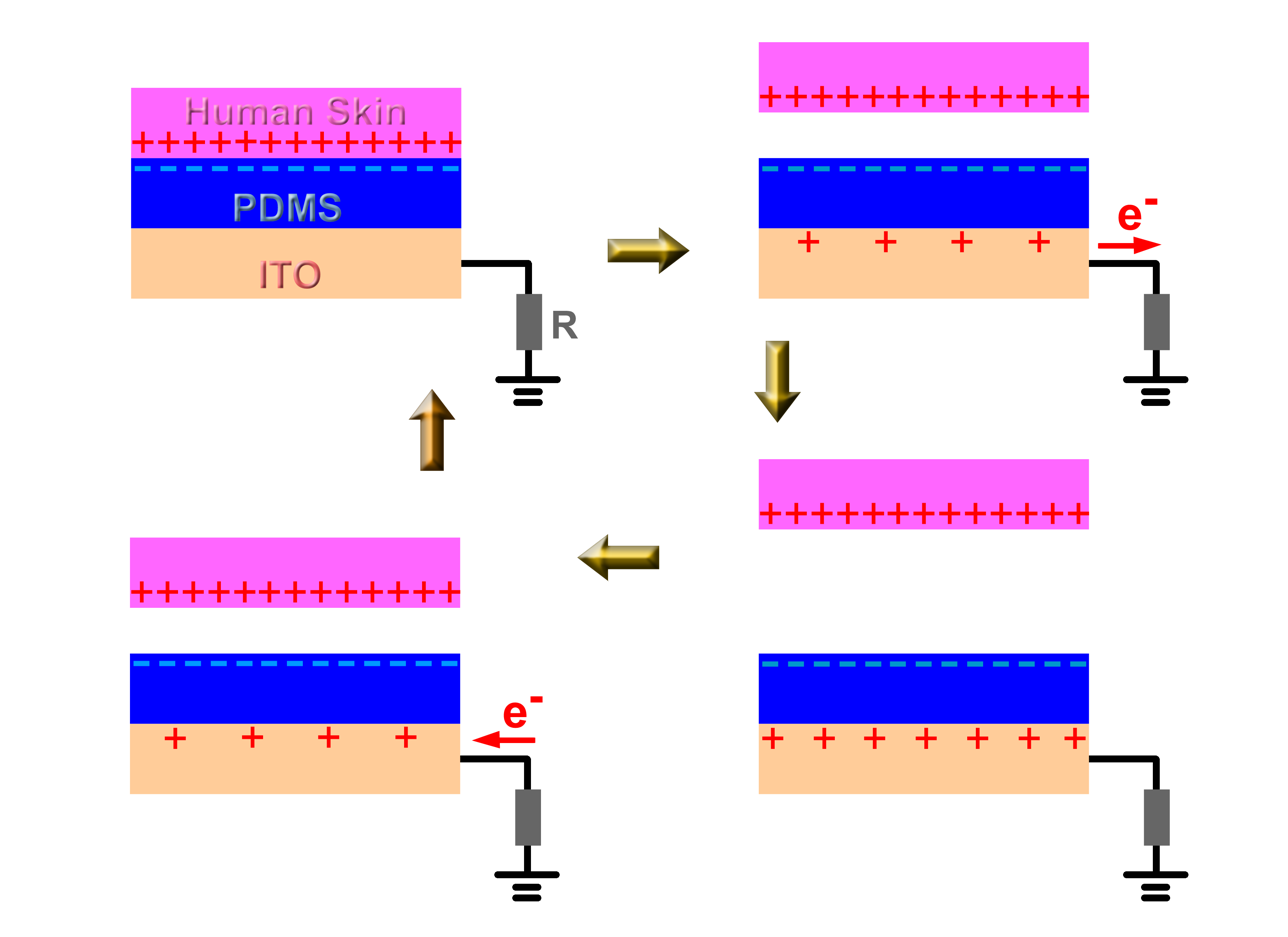
Single-electrode mode of triboelectric nanogenerator

A single-electrode-based triboelectric nanogenerator is introduced as a more practical design for some applications, such as fingertip-driven triboelectric nanogenerators. According to the triboelectric series, electrons were injected from the skin into the PDMS since the PDMS is more triboelectrically negative than the skin. When negative triboelectric charges on the PDMS are fully screened from the induced positive charges on the ITO electrode by increasing the separation distance between the PDMS and skin, no output signals can be observed.

=== Applications ===
TENG is a physical process of converting mechanical agitation to an electric signal through triboelectrification (in the inner circuit) and electrostatic induction processes (in the outer circuit). Harvesting vibration energy might be used to power mobile electronics. TENG has been demonstrated for harvesting ambient vibration energy based on the contact-separation mode. A three-dimensional triboelectric nanogenerator (3D-TENG) has been designed based on a hybridization mode of conjunction between the vertical contact-separation mode and the in-plane sliding mode.

In 2013, Zhonglin Wang's group reported a rotary triboelectric nanogenerator for harvesting wind energy. Subsequently, various types of triboelectric nanogenerators for harvesting ambient energy have been proposed, like 3D spiral structure triboelectric nanogenerators to collect wave energy, fully enclosed triboelectric nanogenerators applied in water and harsh environments, and multi-layered disk nanogenerators for harvesting hydropower. However, due to the limitations of the nanogenerator's working models, the friction generated between layers of the triboelectric nanogenerator will reduce the energy conversion efficiency and the durability of the device. Researchers have designed an all-weather droplet-based triboelectric nanogenerator that relies on the contact electrification effect between liquid and solid to generate electricity.

Self-powered motion sensors

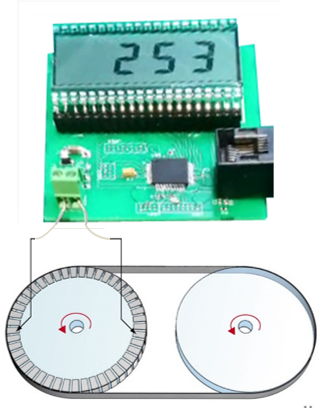
Belt-pulley system powers the encoder circuit by converting friction into electrical energy.

The term "self-powered sensors" can refer to a system that powers all the electronics responsible for measuring detectable movement. For example, the self-powered triboelectric encoder, integrated into a smart belt-pulley system, converts friction into usable electrical energy by storing the harvested energy in a capacitor and fully powering the circuit, which includes a microcontroller and an LCD.

== Pyroelectric nanogenerator ==
A pyroelectric nanogenerator is an energy-harvesting device that converts external thermal energy into electrical energy by using nano-structured pyroelectric materials. The pyroelectric effect is about the spontaneous polarization in certain anisotropic solids as a result of temperature fluctuation. The first pyroelectric nanogenerator was introduced by Zhong Lin Wang at the Georgia Institute of Technology in 2012.

=== Mechanism ===
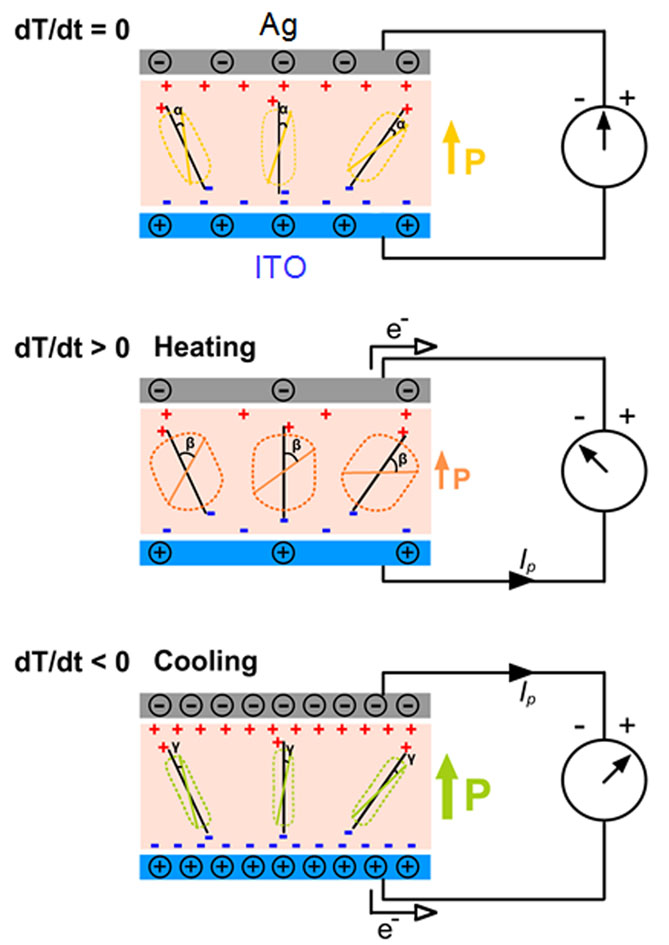
The mechanism of the pyroelectric nanogenerator based on a composite structure of pyroelectric nanowries. It is on negative electric dipoles under (a) room temperature, (b) heated, and (c) cooled conditions. The angles marked in the diagrams represent the degrees to which the dipole would oscillate as driven by statistical thermal fluctuations.

The working principle of a pyroelectric nanogenerator can be explained by the primary pyroelectric effect and the secondary pyroelectric effect.

The primary pyroelectric effect describes the charge produced in a strain-free case. The primary pyroelectric effect dominates the pyroelectric response in PZT, BTO, and some other ferroelectric materials. The mechanism is based on the thermally induced random wobbling of the electric dipole around its equilibrium axis, the magnitude of which increases with increasing temperature. Due to thermal fluctuations at room temperature, the electric dipoles will randomly oscillate within a degree from their respective aligning axes.

Under a fixed temperature, the spontaneous polarization from the electric dipoles is constant. If the temperature in the nanogenerator changes from room temperature to a higher temperature, it will result in the electric dipoles oscillating within a larger degree of spread around their respective aligning axes. The quantity of induced charges in the electrodes is thus reduced, resulting in a flow of electrons. If the nanogenerator is cooled, the electric dipoles oscillate within a smaller degree of spread angle due to the lower thermal activity.

In the second case, the obtained pyroelectric response is explained by the secondary pyroelectric effect, which describes the charge produced by the strain induced by thermal expansion. The secondary pyroelectric effect dominates the pyroelectric response in ZnO, CdS, and some other wurzite-type materials. The thermal deformation can induce a piezoelectric potential difference across the material, which can drive the electrons to flow in the external circuit.

=== Applications ===
In 2012, Zhong Lin Wang used a pyroelectric nanogenerator as a self-powered temperature sensor for detecting a change in temperature, where the response time and reset time of the sensor are about 0.9 and 3 s, respectively.

== See also ==
- Battery (electricity)
- Electrical generator
- Microelectromechanical systems
- Micropower
- Nanoelectromechanical systems
