= TV Ears =

American audio technology company

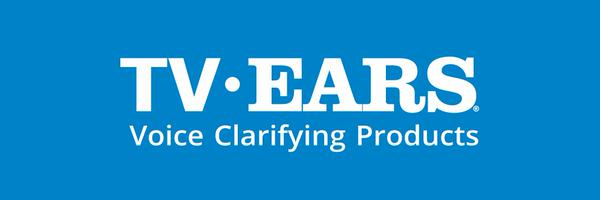
- Type: TV listening headsets
- Inventor: Vincent Primerano
- Inception: April 1998
- Manufacturer: TV Ears
- Models: TV Ears Original System, TV Ears Digital System, TV Ears Dual Digital Bundle, TV Ears Speaker, TV Headphones
- Website: www.tvears.com

TV Ears is an American, privately held audio technology company that specializes in voice clarifying television products for the hearing impaired. It was founded in April 1998 by Vincent Primerano and George Dennis. They are located in Spring Valley, California, where they house the North American distribution center, support, and sales teams, while employing approximately 50 people. TV Ears serves hearing impaired customers throughout the world, with their predominant markets being in the United States, Canada, and Europe.

TV Ears, or voice clarifying television headsets, are classified as an assistive listening device and are specifically designed for clear and distinct television listening and dialogue comprehension. For this reason, TV Ears are legally able to have a volume of 120 decibels. Using digital technology, known as Voice Clarifying Circuitry, the headsets work to automatically and exponentially increase the gain on high frequency sounds. This works to make the words appear clearer from audio tracks that are on television programs or movies. Unlike traditional headphones, TV Ears are worn under the listener's chin where they hook to the ears. With the wireless technology of TV Ears, the user is capable of setting a volume and tone that they're comfortable with, without upsetting others in the vicinity. This is in contrast to noise reduction headphones, which hush ambient sounds by creating frequencies that minimize surrounding noise. However, like headphones, TV Ears are designed for single-user use, meaning that multiple sets must be purchased in the home for multiple and different users.

== History ==
In 1997 George Dennis, an entrepreneur, reached out to his childhood friend Vincent Primerano asking if he had any business or product ideas. Vince owned a Hearing Aid Center in Las Vegas and within a short amount of time he conceived the idea of a TV headset for people with hearing loss. Vince understood the need for a TV listening device because he knew that 80% of the hearing impaired would never seek help. Vince knew the only way it could come together is with business knowledge and extensive experience of his friend George Dennis. George was raised in the business environment because of his parents' family business, and he graduated top of his class from the University of Denver in business and finance. George was already a highly successful entrepreneur at a young age. George assumed the role of CEO.

What Vince and George lacked was technical knowledge and the experience of dealing with product developers. Grant Gaynor, George's cousin, filled this role. The three conceived the first operational (prototype) set of TV Ears in Huntington Beach, California, in 1998. The company started out very small, moving between living rooms, a pool house, and other small studio suites. Today over 2 million people and their families benefit from TV Ears. Today, TV Ears is the No. 1 selling brand for TV listening devices and is recommended by doctors and audiologists around the world. TV Ears is headquartered in San Diego, California where they house the North America distribution center, support, and sales teams.

== Characteristics and technology ==
TV Ears uses infrared So LIT, Speed of Light Infrared Transmission and 5.8 GHz wireless technology. The Transmitter sends television audio wirelessly to the headset without delay or interference. So LIT operates at 2.3 million cycles per second, is safe with pacemakers, does not experience television interference, and can be used by multiple people at once. However, because the system relies on light, visual obstruction has the ability to severely disrupt the signal, which can cause problems with sound quality. The audio frequency response spans a wide range of 20-20,000 Hz with a transmission frequency of 2.3 MHz and a max volume of 125 DB. However, it has been noted that infrared systems are known for exhibiting glitches with the quality of their sound, producing low wavelengths of noise, which can be a problem for those with hearing impairments. With their wireless capabilities, TV Ears may be used with many different kinds of plasma and LCD flat screen televisions, cable, or satellite boxes with audio analog port capabilities.

The system works as a clarifying system from top to bottom. Not only does it increase the audio experience for the user, but it also works to amplify the speech and dialog while decreasing the surrounding ambient noise. TV Ears works using patented technology that is currently unavailable for commercial use anywhere else. This technology includes a revolutionary style of “ear tip” that is self-molding and forms to the shape of the user's outer ear canal. These ear tips create an acoustically sealed chamber within the ear that reduces ambient noises.

By limiting the sound that is received outside of the device, TV Ears is able to pick up low-level sounds that are put out by the television, providing clarity. It does this using Voice Clarifying Circuitry. This technology uses an advanced microchip within the device that captures audio signals, while amplifying the human speech frequency above that of the background noise on the television. Voice Clarifying Circuitry sets TV Ears apart in that it allows the device to pull words out from the noise, including whispers and accents.

TV Ears were designed with their target audience of the hearing impaired and senior citizens in mind. Unlike regular headphones, TV Ears use an under the chin design, similar to that of a stethoscope, with the right and left ear tips connected by the receiver in the center, which then goes under the chin. This under the chin receiver houses the volume and tone control, which is meant to create a better viewing experience.

== Product line ==
=== TV Ears Original ===
The least expensive of all of the TV Ears’ headsets, the Original clarifies and amplifies speech and dialog while lowering background noise. Set up of the Original requires the transmitter to be connected to the analog audio out port on your TV, cable, or satellite box.

=== TV Ears Digital ===
TV Ears Digital is the wireless voice clarifying TV listening device that offers digital connectivity and is compatible with Dolby Digital, SRS, and PCM products. The system is light, weighing in at only two ounces, comes with an adjustable tone control, and ergonomically angled foam ear tips.

=== TV Ears Dual Digital ===
The 5.0 Dual Digital wireless TV listening system, is the most powerful of the TV Ears’ headsets, containing twice the number of light emitting diodes. The system operates off of a digital connectivity via an optical digital audio cord and is compatible with Dolby Digital, SRS, and PCM ensuring that it works successfully with any television, home audio system, cable, or satellite box. Ergonomically angled foam ear tips direct uninterrupted audio directly through the ear canal and create a clear sound with each listen. Using an all-new Snap-Fit Charging mechanism, the Dual Digital gets a perfect charge every time.

=== TV Ears speaker ===
Similar to surround sound, the TV Ears 5.0 Speaker works using wireless technology to provide 90 dB of volume to the user. By plugging the transmitter into the analog or digital ports of the television, cable, or satellite box, the audio travels via speed of light transmission to the user.

== Alternate hearing aid types ==
Though there is only one type of TV Ears there are several different sound clarifying options to help those with hearing impairments.

=== Voice Clarifying Amplifiers ===
Voice Clarifying Amplifiers operate in a similar way to hearing aids. They are placed in the outer ear, are flesh colored, and amplify surrounding noise to make hearing much easier for those with impairments. Using micro-technology, these amplifiers use a separate pouch with a rotary style volume control knob. Because these are meant for everyday use, they can be used for television purposes, though do not use an infrared wavelength to collect sound.

=== TV Ears 5.0 speakers ===
TV Ears’ 5.0 Speaker works like surround sound and brings the sound to the user. Using wireless technology, the speaker provides up to 90 dB of volume, which can accommodate most hearing impairments. The speaker works by plugging the transmitter into the analog or digital ports of the television, cable, or satellite box and uses infrared to send audio to the speaker. Because the speaker is individual of the television, the volume may be adjusted at no cost to the surrounding listeners.

=== Wireless digital headphone systems ===
Usually battery operated, the wireless headphone system uses digital frequency to operate. Unlike TV Ears, transmitters for wireless headphone systems are typically capable of projecting audio waves to several different headsets at one time. Wireless systems are good for up to 20 meters and for advanced music and in-home movie-watching experiences. Leather ear pads make listening comfortable and keep excess sound from escaping and disrupting surrounding viewers.

== Benefits and limitations ==
=== Benefits of TV Ears ===
TV Ears are available without a prescription and are more financially accessible. They can be used with the television's volume on mute, leaving others in the vicinity free from noise and are companionable with any television. Possible applications of the system has been seen in theatres where assistive listening headsets amplify the film's audio in a way similar to that of TV Ears.

=== Limitations of TV Ears ===
TV Ears relies on reading the infrared signal between transmitter and receiver and is operational within a 600 square foot line of sight. The infrared capabilities when blocked may disrupt transmission of sound via the light's wavelength. TV Ears cannot be used for audio use outside of the line of sight of its transmitter. Unlike hearing aids, or other sound clarifying systems, TV Ears cannot be used in everyday settings outside of the home.

== Reception ==
TV Ears sold approximately 2 million systems by 1998. Because the system does not require a prescription, it has been praised for its accessibility. The system can be purchased via the TV Ears’ website.
