= Audio induction loop =

Assistive listening technology

Generic international symbol for a telecoil service, showing a stylised ear and the letter T

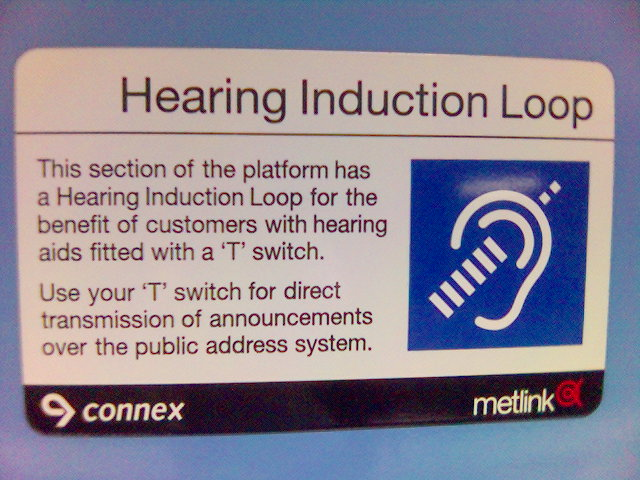
A sign in an Australian railway station to indicate a "Hearing Induction Loop" is available to receive public address system messages through hearing aids with a "T" switch.

An audio induction loop system (also called an audio-frequency induction loop, an AFIL, a hearing loop, a telecoil or a T coil) is an assistive listening device for individuals with reduced ranges of hearing.

== History ==
The first patented magnetic induction loop communication system was invented by Joseph Poliakoff (grandfather of Sir Martyn Poliakoff) in Great Britain in 1937.

The pickup coil in a hearing aid is known as a telecoil (or T-coil) because its early form was to pick up a magnetic field from coils within a telephone. These were included as a part of the method of enabling a two-way conversation over a single pair of wires. The telecoil enabled the hearing aid user to hear the phone conversation clearly without picking up background noise.

From this, the natural development was to generate electromagnetic fields representing the audio, which the telecoil could receive.

== Design ==
A hearing loop consists of one or more physical loops of cable which are placed around a designated area, usually a room or a building. The cable generates an electromagnetic field throughout the looped space which can be picked up by a telecoil-equipped hearing aid, a cochlear implant (CI) processor, or a specialized hand-held hearing loop receiver for individuals without telecoil-compatible hearing aids.

The loops carry baseband audio-frequency currents; no carrier signal is used. The benefit is that it allows the sound source of interest – whether a musical performance or a ticket taker's side of the conversation – to be transmitted to the listener clearly and free of other distracting noise in the environment. Typical installation sites include concert halls, ticket kiosks, high-traffic public buildings (for PA announcements), auditoriums, places of worship, courtrooms, meeting rooms, and homes.

== Theory ==
The simplest form of AFIL is a single wire around a room, driven from a power amplifier as a loudspeaker would be driven. The coupling of magnetic fields is described mathematically by Faraday's law of induction.

== Implementation ==
A basic AFIL using a general purpose amplifier has some disadvantages. The loop driver amplifier requires some additional circuits to overcome these. Using anything other than a correctly designed loop driver amplifier is not only unsatisfactory, but may result in a loop installation that can generate harmonics when driven into distortion, and these will cause radio interference. This must be prevented, both for sound quality and for legal reasons as it is illegal to cause such interference in these circumstances. In Europe, the EMC Directive applies, and it is also illegal to supply or install unsuitable electronic and electrical equipment.

A second factor is that many forms of hearing loss mean that sound levels must be kept fairly constant. An effective loop driver will have an automatic level control to compress the signal, providing a constant loop amplitude for a wide range of source levels. Meeting this requirement is likely to meet the interference requirement at the same time. To do this, the loop driver should give constant output for at least 30 dB input range.

A third problem is the inductance of the loop cable, and its effect upon the higher frequencies of sound. To overcome this, many loop drivers operate as current mode amplifiers instead of voltage mode. By setting the amplifier characteristic between voltage and current mode, the overall performance is optimised for good bandwidth with minimum distortion. There are other options for reducing the effect of cable inductance, including the use of a multi-core cable where the conductors are connected in parallel.

Structural steel and other metalwork in buildings can cause problems by reducing the field strength unevenly across the loop area, causing frequency distortions. In most cases, a solution can be found using combinations of loops with phase shift between them, combined with frequency correction and increased signal strength.

== Interference ==
Audio induction loops create relatively high magnetic field levels. Other equipment must be designed and installed to work properly within this field.

The most common cause of problems is earth loops, where different pieces of equipment are connected together by signal wires, but powered from different power sockets in different parts of the room or building. The combination of the mains earth and signal earth creates a receiving loop that produces an interference signal proportional to the area within the earth loop. Various steps are used to prevent interference on audio and video equipment. Powering signal sources and output devices from the same mains circuit to prevent formation of an earth loop; shielded cables or signal isolators may be used.

== Technical standards ==
An objective of the field strength requirements of standards for AFILs is to make the perceived loudness of sound from the loop the same as from the microphone in the hearing aid. This is the basis of the average field strength of 100mA/m used to generate today's performance standards around the world.

IEC 60118-4 (formerly Britain's BS 6083 part 4, also known as EN 60118-4) is now the main specification for international use. This standard specifies long term average field strength with allowance for program peaks, background noise level, and frequency response.

IEC 62489-1 specifies how to measure the performance of the system components in a hearing loop system. The standard recommends fixed and portable monitoring devices to allow verification of the proper operation of the hearing loop.

BS 7594 (published by the BSI and widely used in Britain) is a non-mandatory guideline for the design and installation of induction loops. It has a comprehensive guide to theory, as well as guidance for those considering the installation of AFILs in buildings for which they may be responsible. It also contains some valuable guidance relating to other equipment within the loop area. The calibration of field strength measuring devices is also included.

== Legislation ==
In the United Kingdom, as an aid for disability, their provision, where reasonably possible, is required by the Equality Act 2010 and previously by the Disability Discrimination Act 1995, and they are available in "the back seats of all London taxis, which have a little microphone embedded in the dashboard in front of the driver; at 18,000 post offices in the U.K.; at most churches and cathedrals", according to Prof. David G. Myers.

== Alternatives ==
In the United States, an alternative technology using FM transmission to "neck loop" receivers was more widely adopted due to economic advantages. In comparison, hearing loop systems require a greater initial investment by the facility operator, but offer greater convenience and avoid the social stigma and hygienic concerns entailed by the FM system's paraphernalia for those who have hearing aids.

Another alternative system, used primarily in theatres, uses invisible infrared radiation; compatible headsets can pick up the modulated infrared energy to reproduce sound.

In 2022, Bluetooth SIG published Bluetooth LE specifications for hearing access audio profile and public broadcasting of audio streams to multiple receivers, marketed as Auracast; this functionality is included in some wireless earbuds released since 2023, as well as specialized receivers for wired headphones.
