= Real ear measurement =

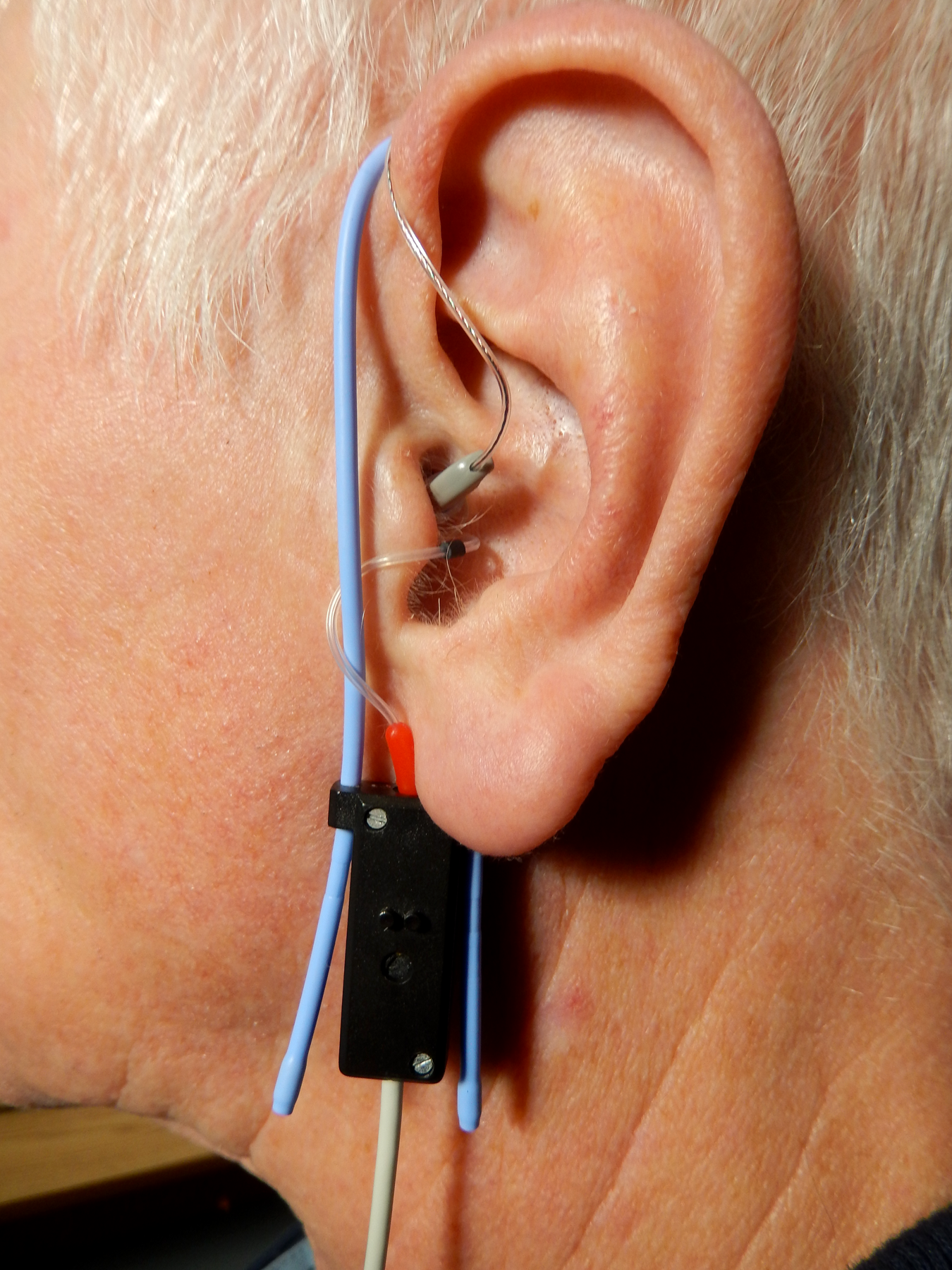
- Real ear measurement showing probe microphone in place and RIC hearing aid.
- Synonyms: In situ or Probe microphone measurement
- Purpose: measure of sound pressure in ear

Real ear measurement is the measurement of sound pressure level in a patient's ear canal developed when a hearing aid is worn. It is measured with the use of a silicone probe tube inserted in the canal connected to a microphone outside the ear and is done to verify that the hearing aid is providing suitable amplification for a patient's hearing loss. The American Speech–Language–Hearing Association (ASHA) and American Academy of Audiology (AAA) recommend real ear measures as the preferred method of verifying the performance of hearing aids. Used by audiologists and other hearing healthcare practitioners in the process of hearing aid fitting, real ear measures are the most reliable and efficient method for assessing the benefit provided by the amplification. Measurement of the sound level in the ear canal allows the clinician to make informed judgements on audibility of sound in the ear and the effectiveness of hearing aid treatment.

The use of real ear measurement to assess the performance of hearing aids is covered in the ANSI specification Methods of Measurement of Real-Ear Performance Characteristics of Hearing Aids, ANSI S3.46-2013 (a revision of ANSI S3.46-1997).

== History ==
The first commercially produced real ear measurement available was made by Rastronics. Help soon arrived. In the early 1980s, the first computerized probe-tube microphone system, the Rastronics CCI-10 (developed in Denmark by Steen Rasmussen), entered the U.S. market (Nielsen and Rasmussen, 1984). This system had a silicone tube attached to the microphone (the transmission of sound through this tube was part of the calibration process), which eliminated the need to place the microphone itself in the ear canal. By early 1985, three or four different manufacturers had introduced this new type of computerized probe microphone equipment, and this hearing aid verification procedure became part of the standard protocol for many audiology clinics.

== Method ==
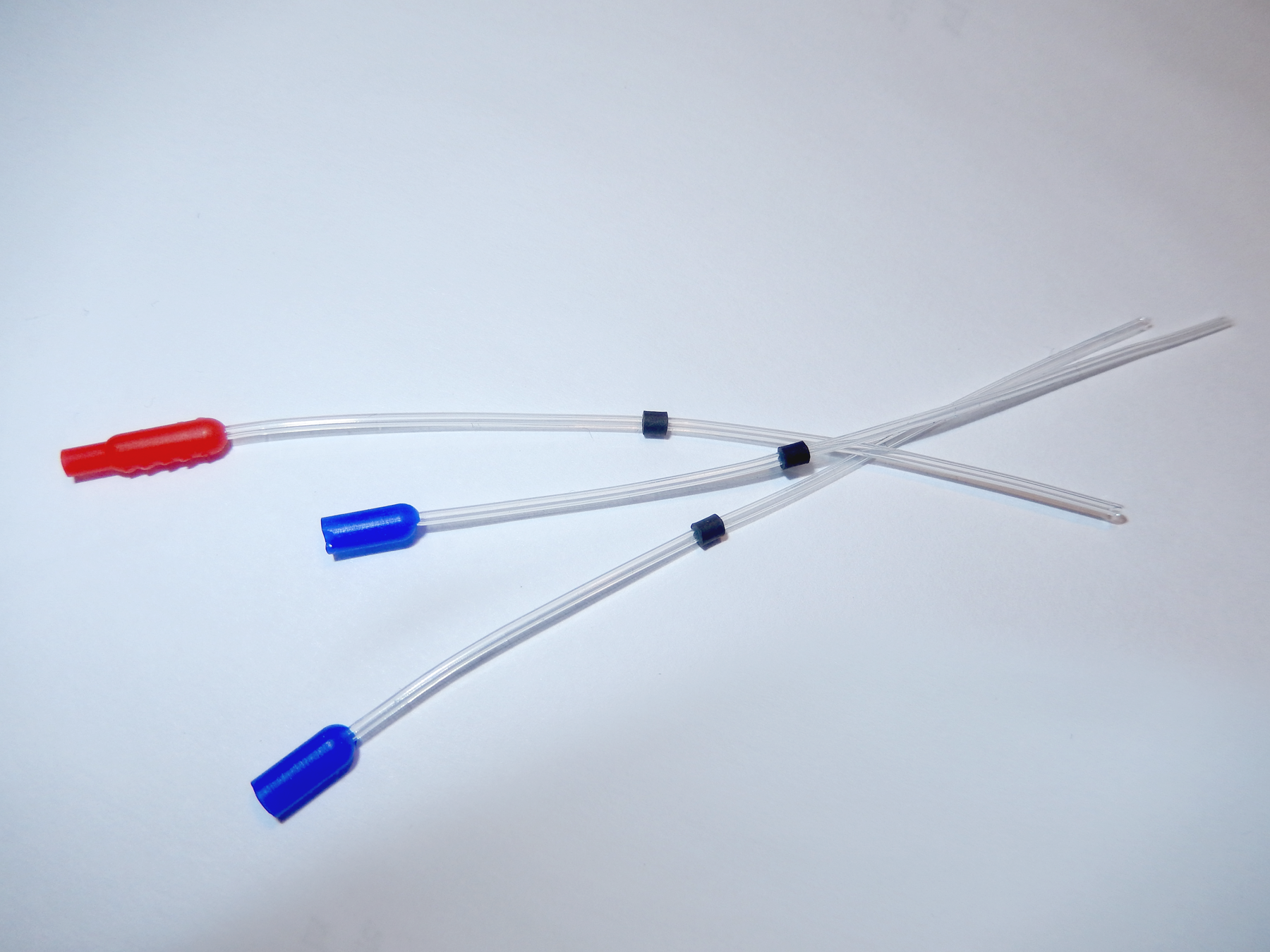
Silicone probe tubes used for real ear measurement.

First, the clinician will examine the ear canal with the use of an otoscope to ensure no wax or other debris will interfere with the positioning of the probe tube. The probe tube is placed with the tip approximately 6 mm (1/4 inch) from the tympanic membrane. Next the hearing aid is put in place. The REM system will typically produce a test stimulus from a loudspeaker situated 12–15 inches (30–38 cm) from the patient's head and simultaneously measure the output in the ear canal to determine how much amplification the hearing aid is providing.

== Insertion gain ==
The traditional method of real ear measurement is known as insertion gain, which is the difference between the sound pressure level measured near the ear drum with a hearing aid in place, and the sound pressure level measured in the unaided ear. First a measurement is made with the probe tube in the open ear (Real Ear Unaided Response, or REUR), then a second one is made using the same test signal with the hearing aid in place and turned on (Real Ear Aided Response, or REAR). The difference between these two results is the insertion gain. This gain can be matched to targets produced by various prescriptive formula based on the patient's audiogram or individual hearing loss.

== Speech mapping ==
Speech mapping (also known as output-based measures) involves testing with a speech or speech-like signal. The hearing aid is adjusted so that the speech is amplified to the approximate middle of the patient's residual auditory area (the amplitude range between the patient's hearing threshold and upper limit of comfort) while observing a real-time spectrum display of the speech in the patient's ear canal. Many multi-channel hearing aids allow each frequency channel to be adjusted separately. The aim is to find a good compromise between intelligibility and loudness discomfort. This approach to hearing aid testing is implemented in most current real ear systems and there has been a significant increase in audiologists selecting to verify using the output method. Using a real speech signal to test a hearing aid has the advantage that features that may need to be disabled in other test approaches can be left active, and the effects of these features in normal use are included in the test.

== See also ==
- Audiometry
- Hearing impairment
