= Auracast =

Bluetooth broadcast audio technology

- Auracast Symbol
- Developed by: Bluetooth Special Interest Group
- Industry: Wireless communication Assistive technology
- Compatible hardware: Smartphones; Hearing aids; Headphones; Earbuds; Personal computers; Televisions
- Short-range wireless

Auracast is a broadcast audio feature of Bluetooth Low Energy (LE Audio) that enables a single transmitting device to stream audio to multiple compatible receivers simultaneously, including hearing aids, headphones, earbuds, and smartphones. Auracast forms part of the Bluetooth LE Audio standard introduced with Bluetooth 5.2 and represents a departure from traditional Bluetooth audio connections, which typically rely on one-to-one device pairing.

The logo is a trademark owned by the Bluetooth Special Interest Group (SIG).

== History ==
Development of Auracast began in the early 2010s within the Bluetooth SIG following collaboration with hearing aid manufacturers seeking improved wireless audio streaming with lower power consumption and broader compatibility.

A key requirement was the ability to deliver the same audio stream to multiple users simultaneously, unlike earlier Bluetooth implementations that supported only point-to-point connections. These efforts contributed to the development of Bluetooth LE Audio, within which Auracast provides broadcast audio functionality.

By the mid-2020s, Auracast began to be implemented in consumer devices and tested in public environments such as airports and event venues.

== Technology ==
Auracast implements public audio broadcasting services, allowing multiple receivers to connect to a single audio transmitter without going through the Bluetooth device pairing process.

It is based on Bluetooth LE Audio and supports transmission of one or more audio streams to potentially unlimited receivers within range.

Auracast: Required device roles by device type
	Transmitter	Receiver	Assistant
BAP	Source	Sink	Assistant
PBP	Source	Sink	Assistant
CAP	Initiator	Acceptor	Commander
TMAP	Sender	Receiver	—N/a
HAP	—N/a	Hearing aid	—N/a

Auracast is defined through a set of Bluetooth LE profiles and services:

- Basic Audio Profile (BAP) 1.0.1
- Public Broadcast Profile (PBP) 1.0
- Common Audio Profile (CAP) 1.0
- Telephony and Media Audio Profile (TMAP) 1.0
- Hearing Access Profile (HAP) 1.0
- Broadcast Audio Scan Service (BASS) 1.0
- Published Audio Capabilities Service (PACS) 1.0.1

Auracast transmitters use Bluetooth advertising to broadcast metadata about available audio streams, including stream name, type of content, and language.

Compatible devices can display this information or automatically connect to selected streams based on user preferences.

Bluetooth LE–enabled smartphones can function as assistants, allowing users to discover, select, and control audio streams on connected receivers such as headphones or hearing aids.

Auracast also supports Broadcast Audio Uniform Resource Identifiers (URIs), marketed as "Scan to Listen", which allow users to connect to specific audio streams via QR code or near-field communication (NFC).

== Applications ==
Auracast is used in both consumer and public environments.

=== Accessibility ===
Auracast enables direct audio streaming to hearing aids and assistive listening devices, improving speech intelligibility in noisy environments compared to older technology such as an Audio induction loop.

=== Public infrastructure ===
Auracast can be used to deliver announcements and audio content in shared spaces such as airports, transport systems, lecture halls, and entertainment venues. In 2025, Bristol Temple Meads railway station was used as a test location for a installation of Auracast as part of its station innovation zone. It remained in place after the trial and is providing translated announcements alongside English announcements.

In 2026, Frankfurt Airport conducted a trial deployment of Auracast to stream gate announcements directly to passengers' personal devices. In the same year Auracast was installed permanently in Brighton railway station.

=== Consumer electronics ===
Auracast functionality is being incorporated into smartphones, computers, televisions, and wireless audio devices. Some platforms, such as Windows 11, have introduced Bluetooth LE Audio–based audio-sharing features supporting multiple simultaneous connections.

== See also ==
- Assistive listening device – Tool to mitigate hearing loss
- Audio induction loop – Assistive listening technology
- Bluetooth – Short-range wireless technology standard
- Bluetooth Low Energy – Wireless personal area network technology
- Hearing aid – Electroacoustic device
