= CROS hearing aid =

A contralateral routing of signals (CROS) hearing aid is a type of hearing aid that is used to treat a condition in which the patient has no usable hearing in one ear and minimal hearing loss or normal hearing in the other ear. This is referred to as single sided deafness.

== Mechanism ==
The CROS hearing aid takes sound from the ear with poorer hearing and transmits to the ear with better hearing. The goal of this device is to give the patient two-sided hearing when true bilateral hearing is not possible. The CROS system is an alternative to traditional unilateral hearing aid fittings in which the patient receives no information from the side with hearing loss.

Most systems are now wireless and are either behind the ear or custom built in-the-ear systems. These wireless systems have replaced earlier wired units which were bulky and rather fussy. Few people found them beneficial, and by contrast the wireless are easier to use and to wear. There are also systems incorporated into eyeglasses. If hearing loss exists in the better ear then a system in the good ear that combines the function of a regular hearing aid with that of a CROS aid is recommended. This configuration is called a BiCROS system.

Current CROS devices utilize wireless streaming to transmit the signal from the poor ear to the better hearing ear. This is accomplished by near field induction or radio waves.

== Configuration ==
=== Air conduction CROS systems ===
On the impaired side, a microphone is encased in a behind the ear (BTE) styled case or a custom, in the ear (ITE) piece. The receiver is on good ear.

=== BiCROS system ===
This system is utilized in patients who have Single Sided Deafness who also have hearing loss in their better hearing ear. In addition to the configuration included in the CROS system, the BiCROS includes microphones on the better hearing side and both microphones are amplified and presented to the better hearing ear.

=== Transcranial CROS system ===
In this configuration, the signal is transmitted through the skull via bone conduction. There are two methods for this:

Direct bone conduction transducers

A bone oscillator is placed on the mastoid of the skull on the worse ear, either using a surgically embedded abutment (with external sound processor held on by a percutaneous abutment or a magnet implanted under the skin) or physically held on with a headband. Sound is transmitted through the skull to the better ear.

Bone conduction via air conduction transducer

The signal is presented to the poor ear at a level loud enough to cross over to the better hearing ear via bone conduction. A powerful hearing aid is fit deeply in the ear canal to produce enough sound. This option may be preferable due to the single unit that is used, leaving the better ear unrestricted.

== Notes ==
1. Harford, E., Barry, J. (1965). A rehabilitative approach to the problem of unilateral hearing impairment: Contralateral routing of signals (CROS). J Speech Hear Dis, 30, 121-138.
2. Ricketts, Todd; Bentler, Ruth; Mueller, Gustav (2017). "Hearing Aid Styles and Fitting Applications". Essentials of Modern Hearing Aids: Selection, Fitting, Verification. San Diego, California: Plural Publishing. pp. 258–260. ISBN 9781597568531.
3. "CROS hearing aids". hearpeers. Archived from the original on 7 June 2016.
