= Hearing aid =

Electroacoustic device

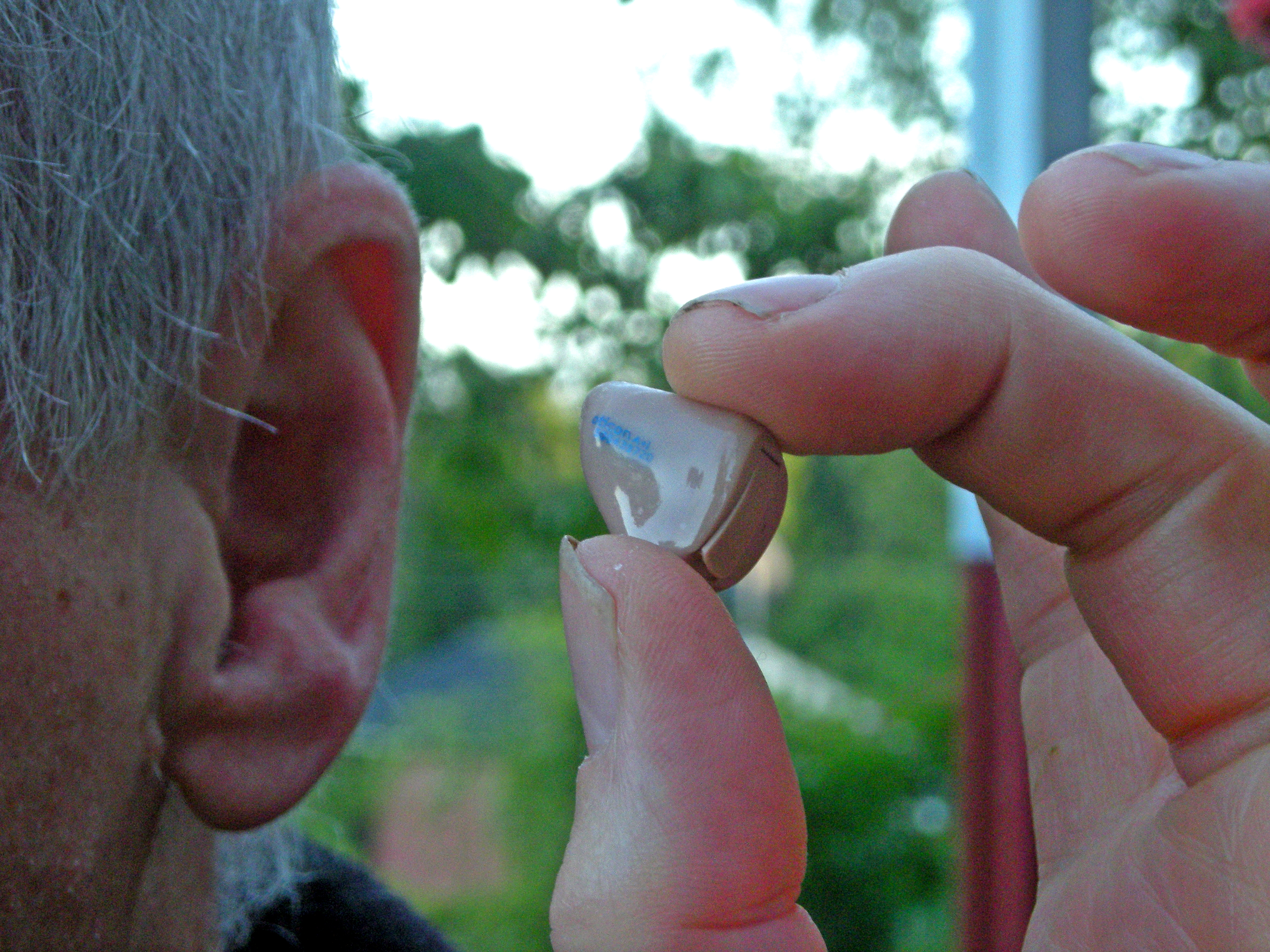
- In-the-canal hearing aid
- Other names: Deaf aid

A hearing aid is a device designed to improve hearing by making sound audible to a person with hearing loss. Hearing aids are classified as medical devices in most countries, and regulated by the respective regulations. Small audio amplifiers such as personal sound amplification products (PSAPs) or other plain sound reinforcing systems cannot be sold as "hearing aids".

Early devices, such as ear trumpets or ear horns, were passive amplification cones designed to gather sound energy and direct it into the ear canal.

Modern devices are computerised electroacoustic systems that transform environmental sound to make it audible, according to audiometrical and cognitive rules. Modern devices also utilize sophisticated digital signal processing, aiming to improve speech intelligibility and comfort for the user. Such signal processing includes feedback management, wide dynamic range compression, directionality, frequency lowering, and noise reduction.

Modern hearing aids require calibration and configuration to match the hearing loss, physical features, and lifestyle of the wearer. The hearing aid is fitted to the most recent audiogram and is programmed by frequency. This process, called "fitting", can be performed by the user in simple cases, by a Doctor of Audiology (an AuD) - also called an audiologist, or by a Hearing Instrument Specialist (HIS) or audioprosthologist. The amount of benefits a hearing aid delivers depends in large part on the quality of its fitting. Almost all hearing aids in use in the United States are digital hearing aids, as analog aids are phased out. Devices similar to hearing aids include the osseointegrated auditory prosthesis (formerly called the bone-anchored hearing aid) and cochlear implant.

== Uses ==
Hearing aids are used for a variety of pathologies including sensorineural hearing loss, conductive hearing loss, and single-sided deafness. Hearing aid candidacy was traditionally determined by a Doctor of Audiology, or a certified hearing specialist, who will also fit the device based on the nature and degree of the hearing loss being treated. The amount of benefit experienced by the user of the hearing aid is multi-factorial, depending on the type, severity, and etiology of the hearing loss, the technology and fitting of the device, and on the motivation, personality, lifestyle, and overall health of the user. Over-the-counter hearing aids, which address mild to moderate hearing loss, are designed to be adjusted by the user.

Hearing aids are incapable of truly correcting a hearing loss; they are an aid to make sounds more audible. The most common form of hearing loss for which hearing aids are sought is sensorineural, resulting from damage to the hair cells and synapses of the cochlea and auditory nerve. Sensorineural hearing loss reduces the sensitivity to sound, which a hearing aid can partially accommodate by making sound louder. Other decrements in auditory perception caused by sensorineural hearing loss, such as abnormal spectral and temporal processing, and which may negatively affect speech perception, are more difficult to compensate for using digital signal processing and in some cases may be exacerbated by the use of amplification. Conductive hearing losses, which do not involve damage to the cochlea, tend to be better treated by hearing aids; the hearing aid is able to sufficiently amplify sound to account for the attenuation caused by the conductive component. Once the sound is able to reach the cochlea at normal or near-normal levels, the cochlea and auditory nerve are able to transmit signals to the brain normally.

Common issues with hearing aid fitting and use are the occlusion effect, loudness recruitment, and understanding speech in noise. Once a common problem, feedback is generally now well-controlled through the use of feedback management algorithms.

== Candidacy and acquisition ==
There are many ways to evaluate how well a hearing aid compensates for hearing loss. One approach is audiometry which measures a subject's hearing levels in laboratory conditions. The threshold of audibility for various sounds and intensities is measured in a variety of conditions. Although audiometric tests may attempt to mimic real-world conditions, the patient's own every day experiences may differ. An alternative approach is self-report assessment, where the patient reports their experience with the hearing aid.

Hearing aid outcome can be represented by three dimensions:

1. hearing aid usage
2. aided speech recognition
3. benefit/satisfaction

The most reliable method for assessing the correct adjustment of a hearing aid is through real ear measurement. Real ear measurements (or probe microphone measurements) are an assessment of the characteristics of hearing aid amplification near the ear drum using a silicone probe tube microphone.

== Types ==
There are many types of hearing aids (also known as hearing instruments), which vary in size, power and circuitry. Among the different sizes and models are:

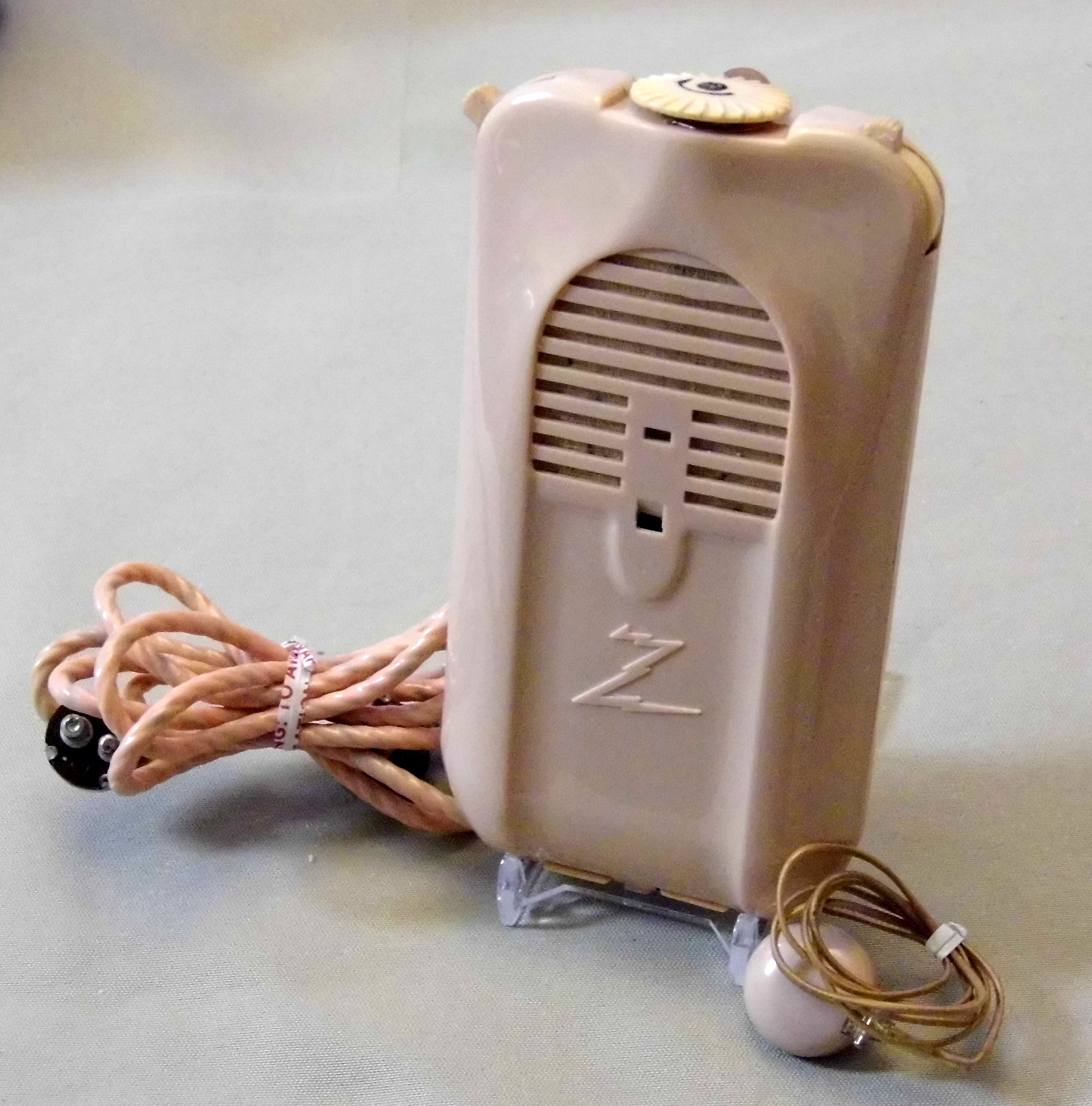
Vacuum tube hearing aid, circa 1944

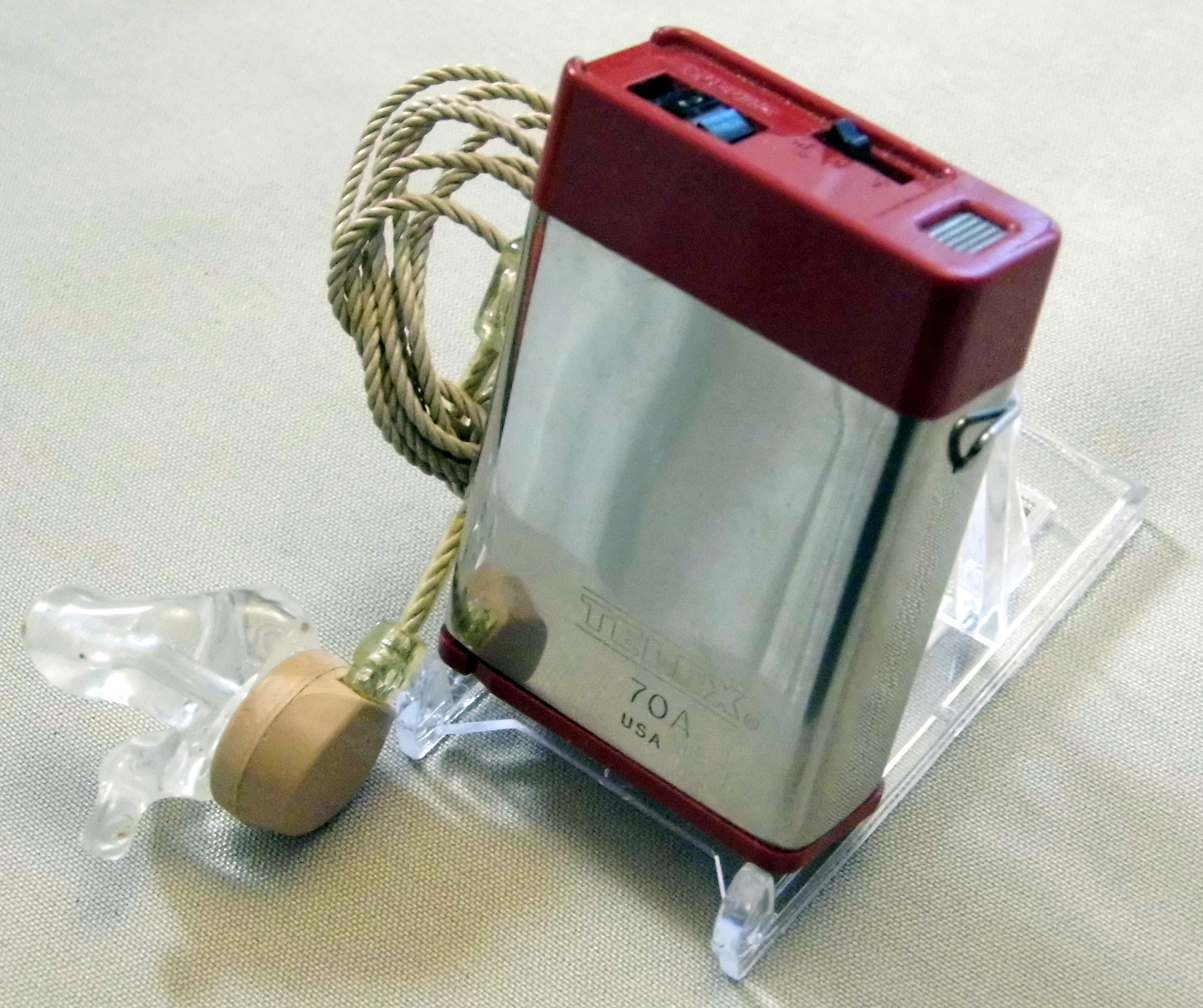
Transistor body-worn hearing aid.

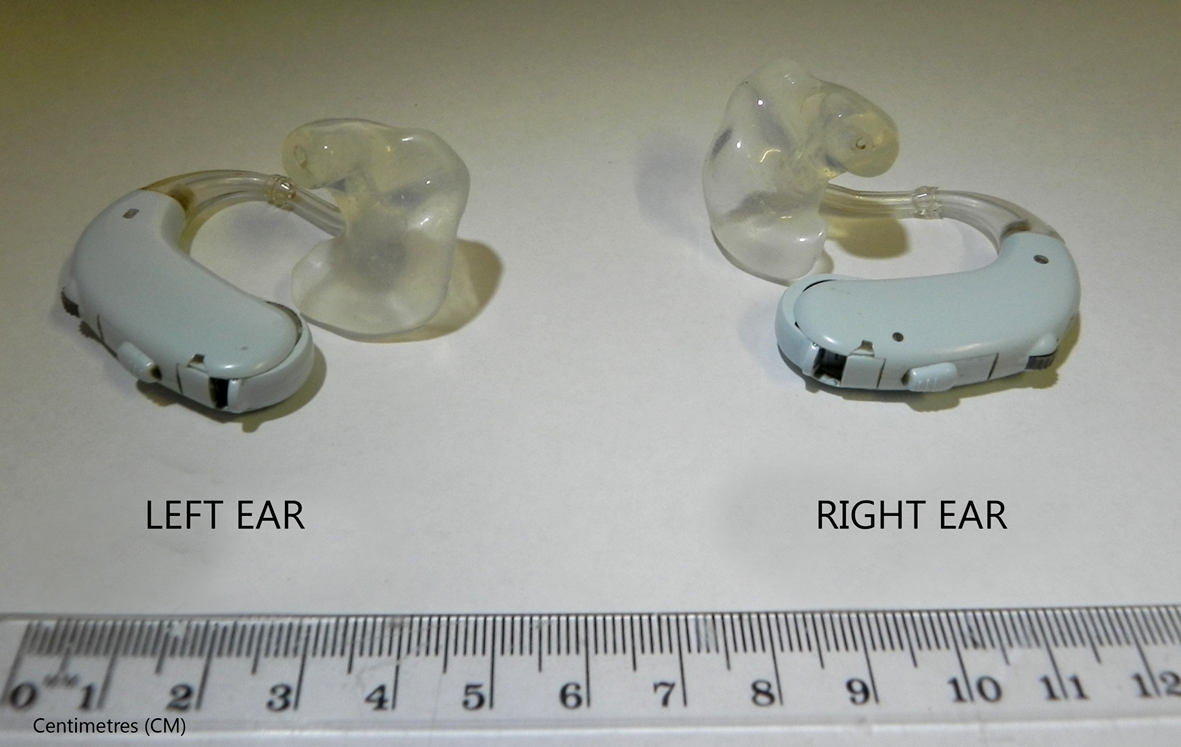
Pair of BTE hearing aids with earmolds.

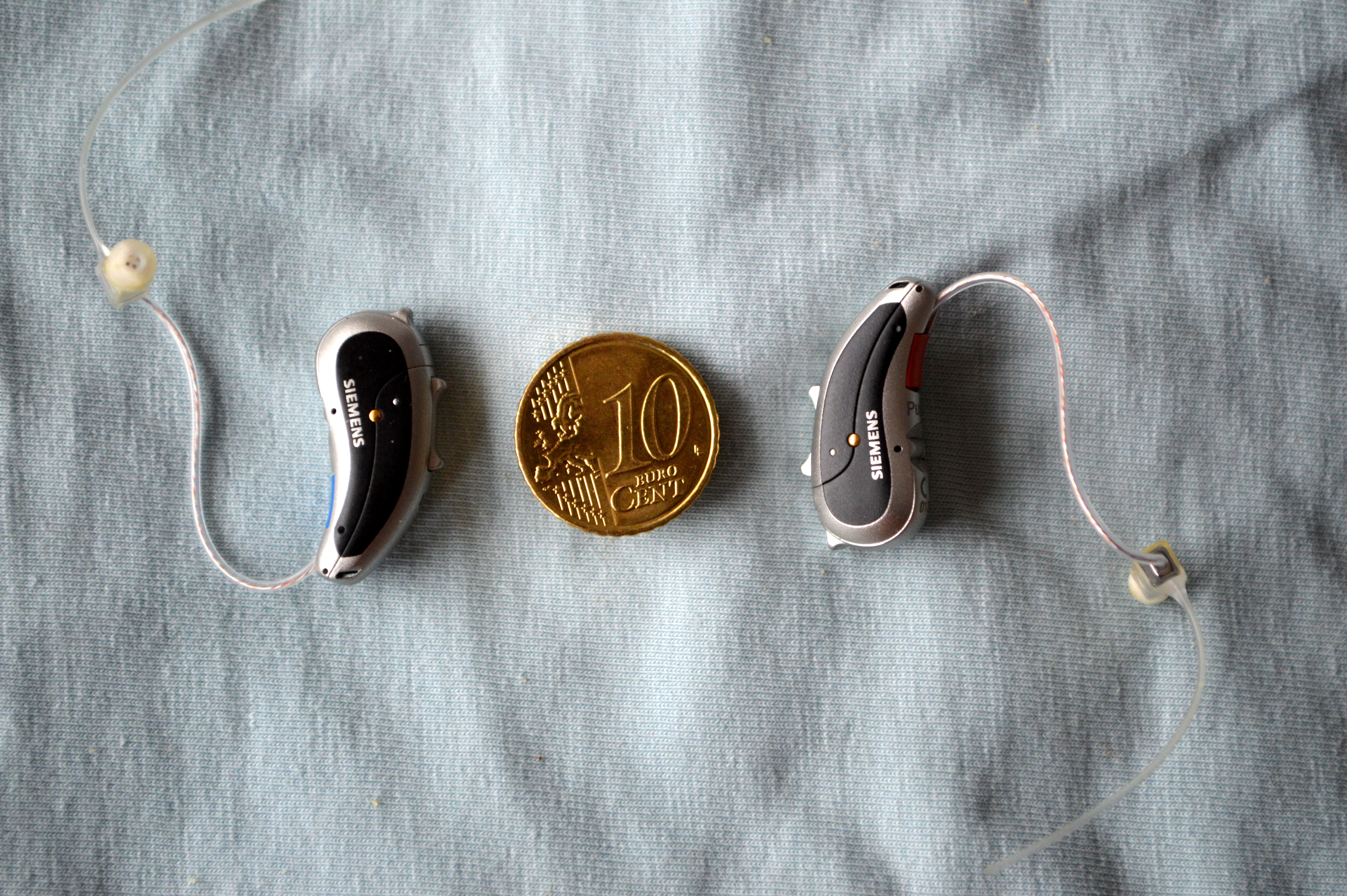
Receiver-in-the-canal hearing aids

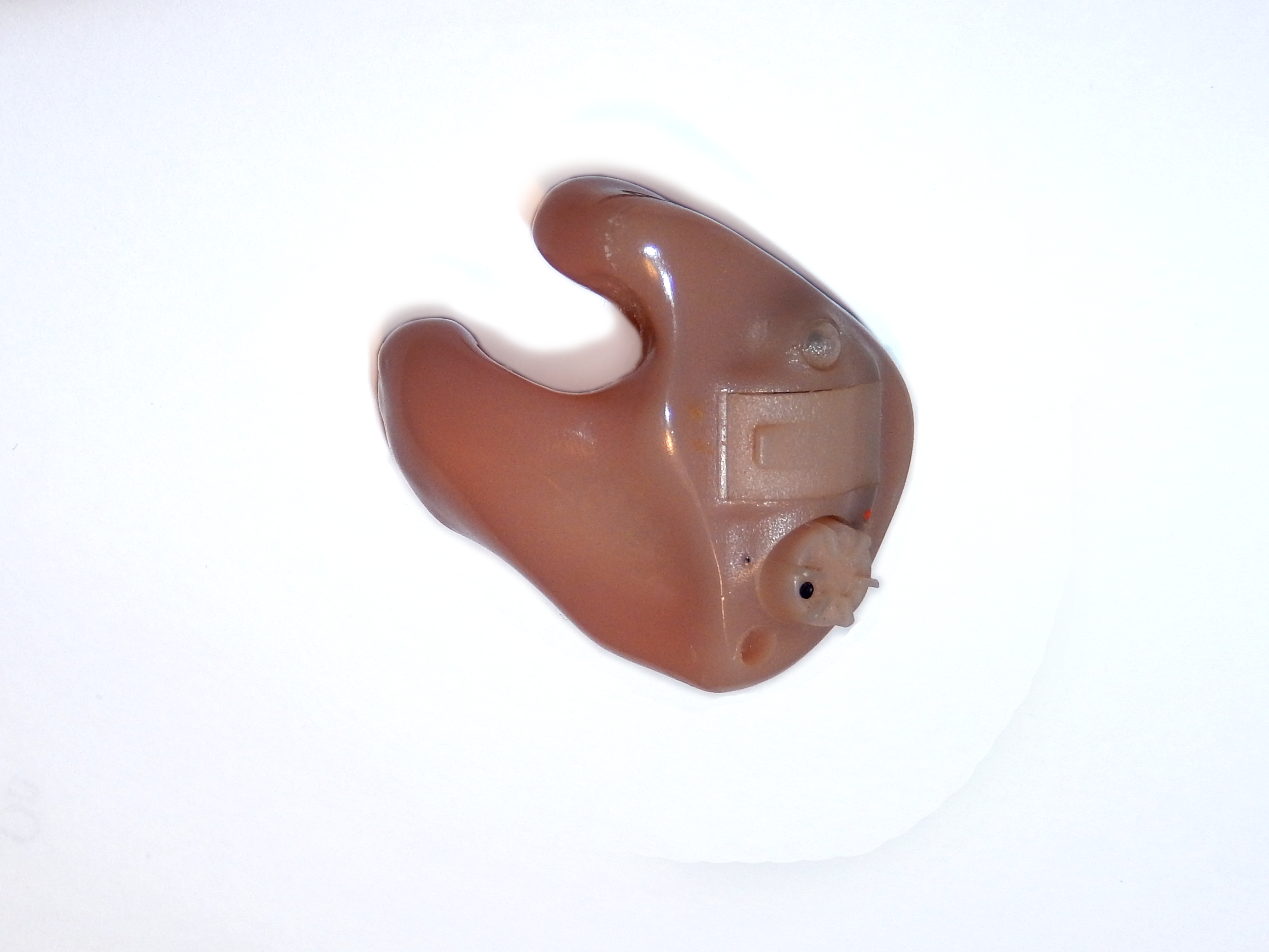
In-the-ear hearing aid

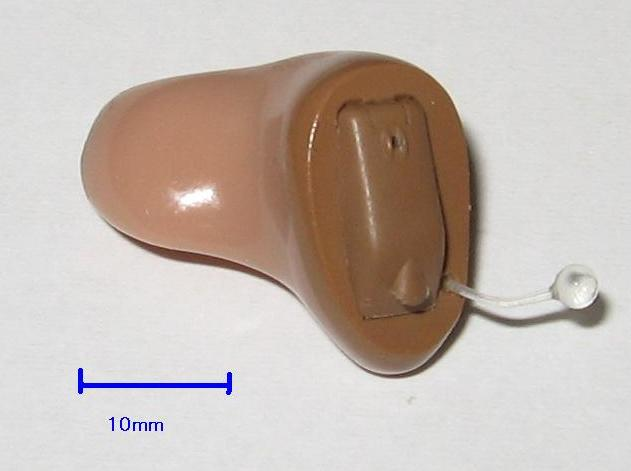
In-the-canal hearing aid

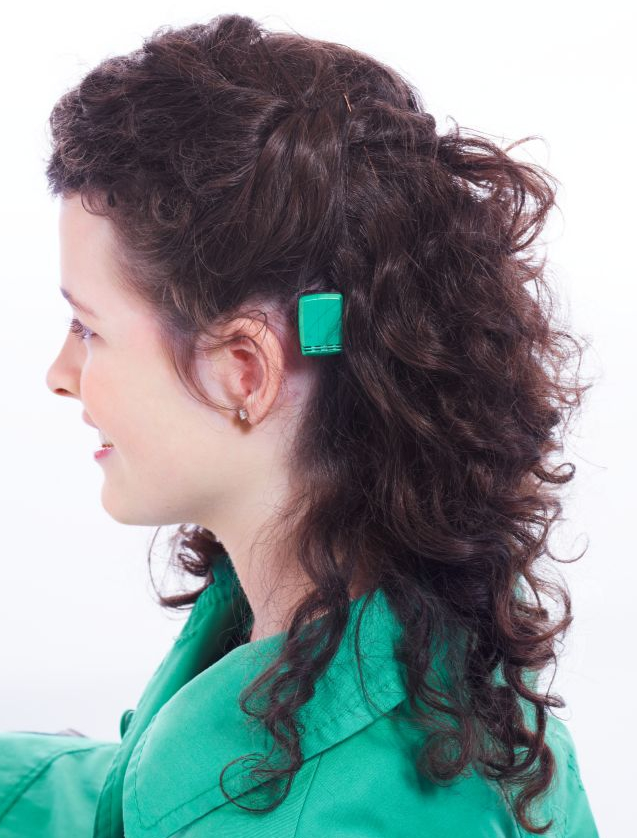
Woman wearing a bone anchored hearing aid

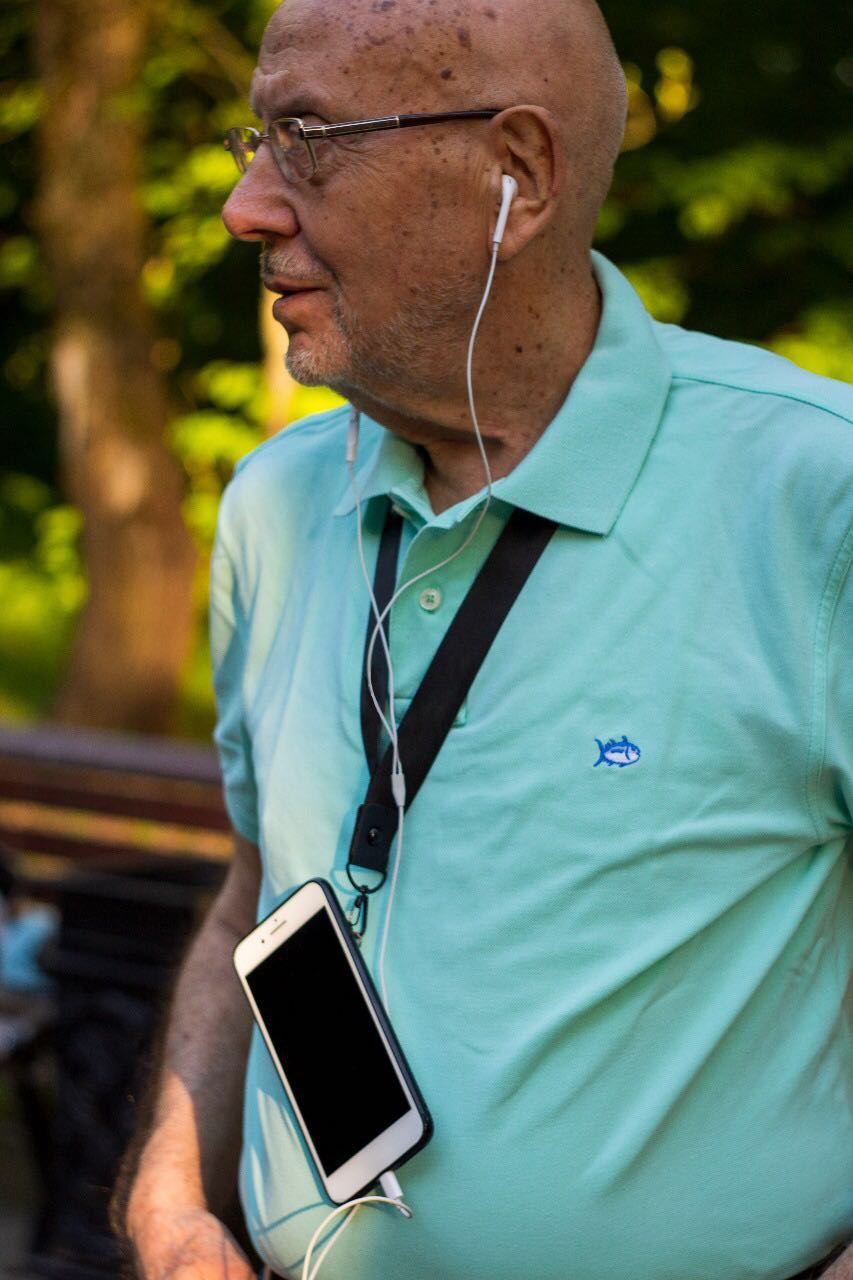
Hearing aid application

=== Body-worn ===
Body worn aids were the first portable electronic hearing aids, and were invented by Harvey Fletcher while working at Bell Laboratories. Body aids consist of a case and an earmold, attached by a wire. The case contains the electronic amplifier components, controls and battery, while the earmold typically contains a miniature loudspeaker. The case is typically about the size of a pack of playing cards and is carried in a pocket or on a belt. Without the size constraints of smaller hearing devices, body worn aid designs can provide large amplification and long battery life at a lower cost. Body aids are still used in emerging markets because of their relatively low cost.

=== Behind the ear ===
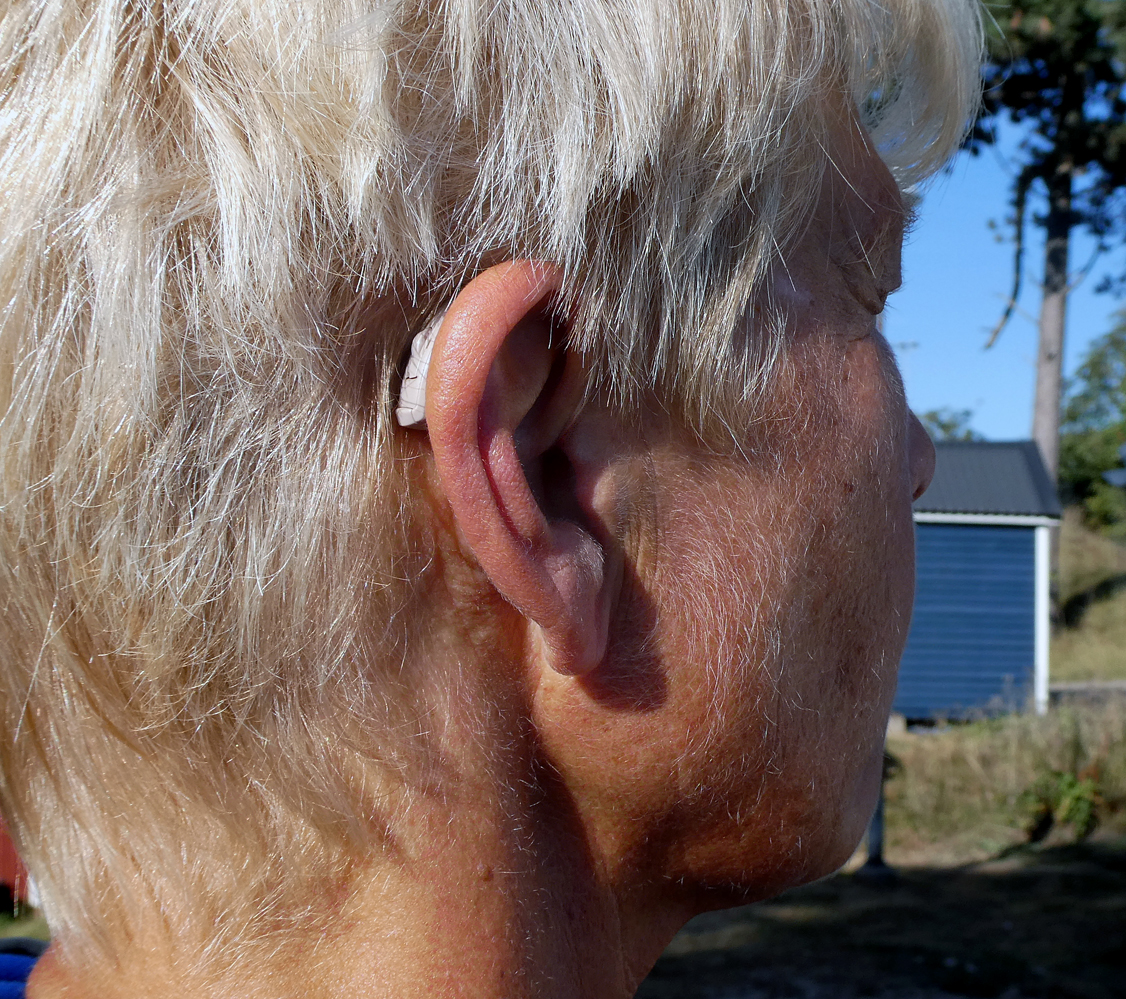
A modern behind the ear hearing aid. The audio tube to the speaker is barely visible.

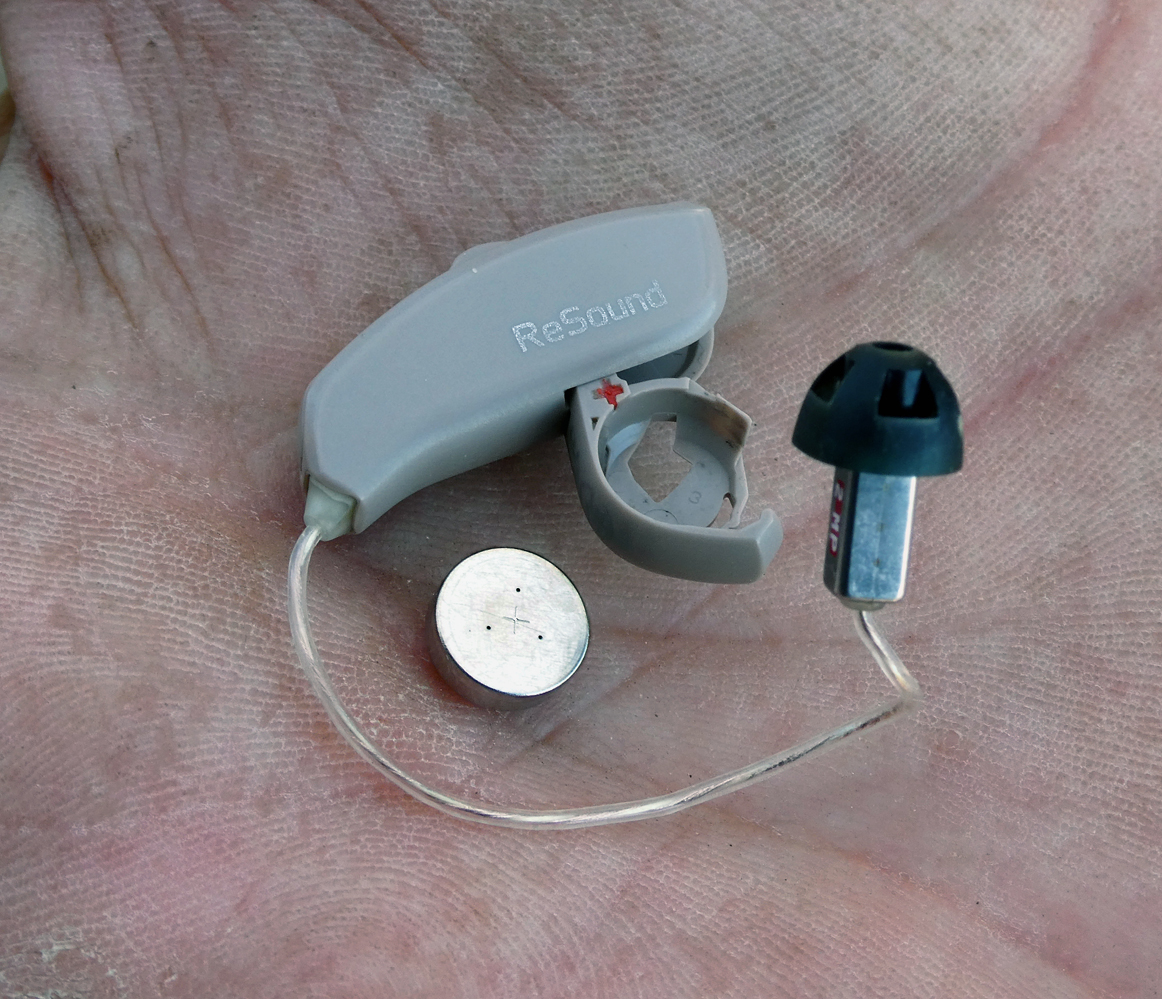
A modern behind the ear hearing aid with a minicell battery

Behind the ear hearing aids are one of two major classes of hearing aids – behind the ear (BTE) and in the ear (ITE). These two classes are distinguished by where the hearing aid is worn. BTE hearing aids consist of a case which hangs behind the pinna. The case is attached to an earmold or dome tip by a traditional tube, slim tube, or wire. The tube or wire courses from the superior-ventral portion of the pinna to the concha, where the ear mold or dome tip inserts into the external auditory canal. The case contains the electronics, controls, battery, and microphone(s).The loudspeaker, or receiver, may be housed in the case (traditional BTE) or in the earmold or dome tip (receiver-in-the-canal, or RIC). The RIC style of BTE hearing aid is often smaller than a traditional BTE and more commonly used in more active populations.

BTEs are generally capable of providing more output and may therefore be indicated for more severe degrees of hearing loss. However, BTEs are very versatile and can be used for nearly any kind of hearing loss. BTEs come in a variety of sizes, ranging from a small, "mini BTE", to larger, ultra-power devices. Size typically depends on the output level needed, the location of the receiver, and the presence or absence of a telecoil. BTEs are durable, easy to repair, and often have controls and battery doors that are easier to manipulate. BTEs are also easily connected to assistive listening devices, such as FM systems and induction loops. BTEs are commonly worn by children who need a durable type of hearing aid.

=== In the ear ===
In the ear aids (ITE) devices fit in the outer ear bowl (called the concha). Being larger, these are easier to insert and can hold extra features. They are sometimes visible when standing face to face with someone. ITE hearing aids are custom made to fit each individual's ear. They can be used in mild to some severe hearing losses. Feedback, a squealing/whistling caused by sound (particularly high frequency sound) leaking and being amplified again, may be a problem for severe hearing losses. Some modern circuits are able to provide feedback regulation or cancellation to assist with this. Venting may also cause feedback. A vent is a tube primarily placed to offer pressure equalization. However, different vent styles and sizes can be used to influence and prevent feedback. Traditionally, ITEs have not been recommended for young children because their fit could not be as easily modified as the earmold for a BTE, and thus the aid had to be replaced frequently as the child grew. However, there are new ITEs made from a silicone type material that mitigates the need for costly replacements. ITE hearing aids can be connected wirelessly to FM systems, for instance with a body-worn FM receiver with induction neck-loop which transmits the audio signal from the FM transmitter inductively to the telecoil inside the hearing instrument.

Mini in canal (MIC) or completely in canal (CIC) aids are generally not visible unless the viewer looks directly into the wearer's ear. These aids are intended for mild to moderately severe losses. CICs are usually not recommended for people with good low-frequency hearing, as the occlusion effect is much more noticeable. Completely-in-the-canal hearing aids fit tightly deep in the ear. It is barely visible. Being small, it will not have a directional microphone, and its small batteries will have a short life, and the batteries and controls may be difficult to manage. Its position in the ear prevents wind noise and makes it easier to use phones without feedback. In-the-canal hearing aids are placed deep in the ear canal. They are barely visible. Larger versions of these can have directional microphones. Being in the canal, they are less likely to cause a plugged feeling. These models are easier to manipulate than the smaller completely in-the-canal models but still have the drawbacks of being rather small.

In-the-ear hearing aids are typically more expensive than behind-the-ear counterparts of equal functionality, because they are custom fitted to the patient's ear. In fitting, the audiologist takes a physical impression (mold) of the ear. The mold is scanned by a specialized CAD system, resulting in a 3D model of the outer ear. During modeling, the venting tube is inserted. The digitally modeled shell is printed using a rapid prototyping technique such as stereolithography. Finally, the aid is assembled and shipped to the audiologist after a quality check.

=== Invisible-in-canal hearing aids ===
Invisible-in-canal hearing aids (IIC) style of hearing aids fits inside the ear canal completely, leaving little to no trace of an installed hearing aid visible. This is because it fits deeper in the canal than other types, so that it is out of view even when looking directly into the ear bowl (concha). A comfortable fit is achieved because the shell of the aid is custom-made to the individual ear canal after taking a mold. Invisible hearing aid types use venting and their deep placement in the ear canal to give a more natural experience of hearing. Unlike other hearing aid types, with the IIC aid the majority of the ear is not blocked (occluded) by a large plastic shell. This means that sound can be collected more naturally by the shape of the ear, and can travel down into the ear canal as it would with unassisted hearing. Depending on their size, some models allow the wearer to use a mobile phone as a remote control to alter memory and volume settings, instead of taking the IIC out to do this. IIC types are most suitable for users up to middle age, but are not suitable for elderly people with unsteady hands.

=== Extended wear hearing aids ===
Extended wear hearing aids are hearing devices that are non-surgically placed in the ear canal by a hearing professional. The extended wear hearing aid represents the first "invisible" hearing device. These devices are worn for 1–3 months at a time without removal. They are made of soft material designed to contour to each user and can be used by people with mild to moderately severe hearing loss. Their close proximity to the ear drum results in improved sound directionality and localization, reduced feedback, and improved high frequency gain. While traditional BTE or ITC hearing aids require daily insertion and removal, extended wear hearing aids are worn continuously and then replaced with a new device. Users can change volume and settings without the aid of a hearing professional. The devices are very useful for active individuals because their design protects against moisture and earwax and can be worn while exercising, showering, etc. Because the device's placement within the ear canal makes them invisible to observers, extended wear hearing aids are popular with those who are self-conscious about the aesthetics of BTE or ITC hearing aid models. As with other hearing devices, compatibility is based on an individual's hearing loss, ear size and shape, medical conditions, and lifestyle. The disadvantages include regular removal and reinsertion of the device when the battery dies, inability to go underwater, earplugs when showering, and for some discomfort with the fit since it is inserted deeply in the ear canal, the only part of the body where skin rests directly on top of bone.

=== CROS hearing aid ===
A CROS hearing aid is a hearing aid that transmits auditory information from one side of the head to the other side of the head. Candidates include people who have poor word understanding on one side, no hearing on one side, or who are not benefiting from a hearing aid on one side. CROS hearing aids can appear very similar to behind the ear hearing aids. The CROS system can assist the patient in sound localization and understanding auditory information on their poor side. While CROS hearing aids can be quite effective, the long-term solution for those with hearing issues on one side is to use a BiCROS system. This creates more of a balance for wearers.

=== Bone-anchored ===
A bone anchored hearing aid (BAHA) is a surgically implanted auditory prosthetic based on bone conduction. It is an option for patients without external ear canals, when conventional hearing aids with a mold in the ear cannot be used. The BAHA uses the skull as a pathway for sound to travel to the inner ear. For people with conductive hearing loss, the BAHA bypasses the external auditory canal and middle ear, stimulating the functioning cochlea. For people with unilateral hearing loss, the BAHA uses the skull to conduct the sound from the deaf side to the side with the functioning cochlea.

Individuals under the age of two (five in the USA) typically wear the BAHA device on a Softband. This can be worn from the age of one month as babies tend to tolerate this arrangement very well. When the child's skull bone is sufficiently thick, a titanium "post" can be surgically embedded into the skull with a small abutment exposed outside the skin. The BAHA sound processor sits on this abutment and transmits sound vibrations to the external abutment of the titanium implant. The implant vibrates the skull and inner ear, which stimulate the nerve fibers of the inner ear, allowing hearing.

The surgical procedure is simple both for the surgeon, involving very few risks for the experienced ear surgeon. For the patient, minimal discomfort and pain is reported. Patients may experience numbness of the area around the implant as small superficial nerves in the skin are sectioned during the procedure. This often disappears after some time. There is no risk of further hearing loss due to the surgery. One important feature of the BAHA is that, if a patient for whatever reason does not want to continue with the arrangement, it takes the surgeon less than a minute to remove it. The BAHA does not restrict the wearer from any activities such as outdoor life, sporting activities etc.

A BAHA can be connected to an FM system by attaching a miniaturized FM receiver to it.

Two main brands manufacture BAHAs today – the original inventors Cochlear, and the hearing aid company Oticon.

=== Eyeglass aids ===
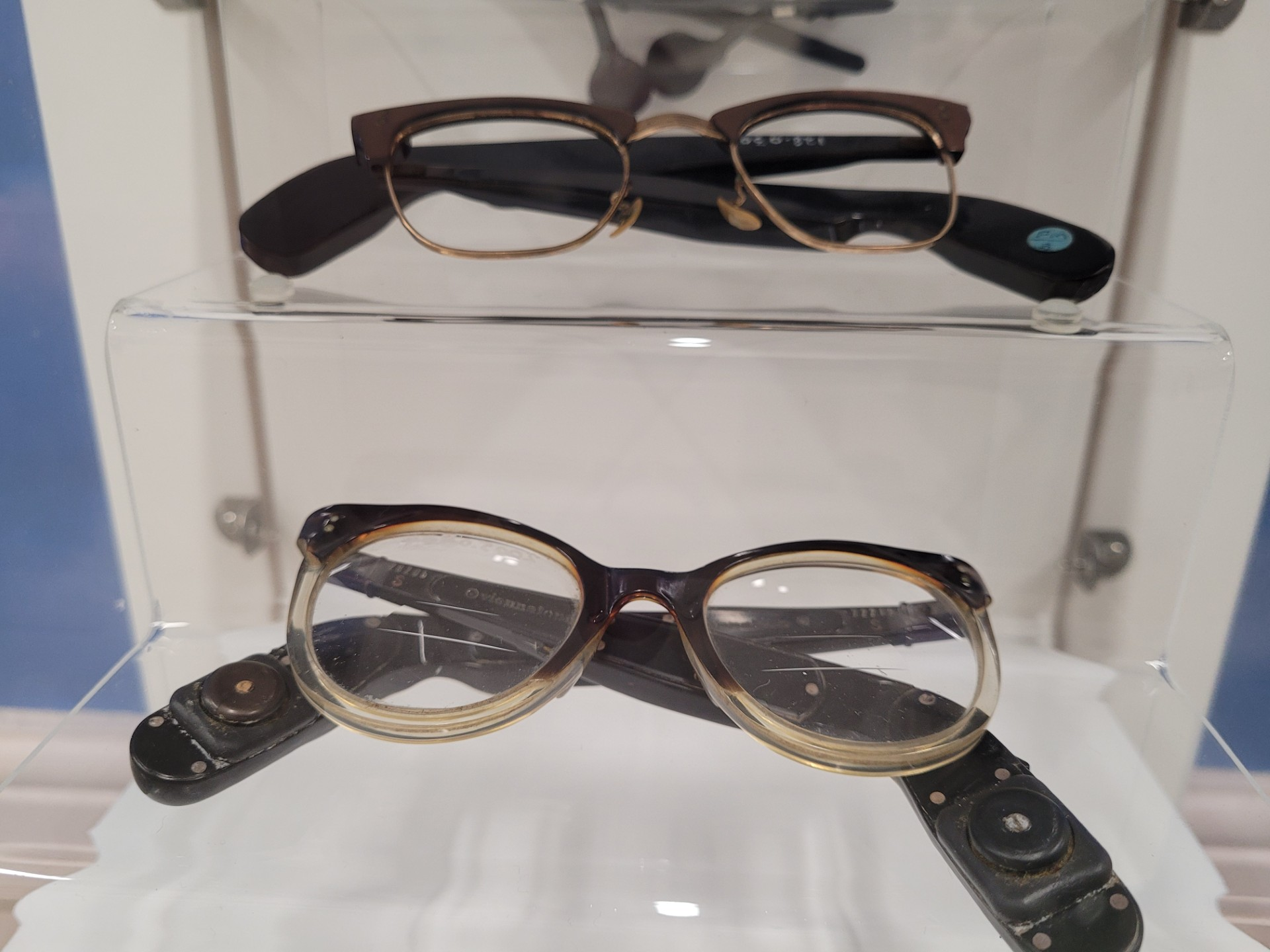
1940s adult and child combined hearing aid glasses, on display at Thackray Museum of Medicine.

During the late 1950s to 1970s, before in-the-ear aids became common (and in an era when thick-rimmed eyeglasses were popular), people who wore both glasses and hearing aids frequently chose a type of hearing aid that was built into the temple pieces of the spectacles. However, the combination of glasses and hearing aids was inflexible: the range of frame styles was limited, and the user had to wear both hearing aids and glasses at once or wear neither. Today, people who use both glasses and hearing aids can use in-the-ear types, or rest a BTE neatly alongside the arm of the glasses. There are still some specialized situations where hearing aids built into the frame of eyeglasses can be useful, such as when a person has hearing loss mainly in one ear: sound from a microphone on the "bad" side can be sent through the frame to the side with better hearing.

This can also be achieved by using CROS or bi-CROS style hearing aids, which are now Wireless in sending sound to the better side.

==== Spectacle hearing aids ====
These are generally worn by people with a hearing loss who either prefer a more cosmetic appeal of their hearing aids by being attached to their glasses or where sound cannot be passed in the normal way, via a hearing aids, perhaps due to a blockage in the ear canal. pathway or if the client experiences continual infections in the ear.

Spectacle aids come in two forms, bone conduction spectacles and air conduction spectacles.

==== Bone conduction spectacles ====
Sounds are transmitted via a receiver attached from the arm of the spectacles which are fitted firmly behind the boney portion of the skull at the back of the ear, (mastoid process) by means of pressure, applied on the arm of the spectacles. The sound is passed from the receiver on the arm of the spectacles to the inner ear (cochlea), via the bony portion. The process of transmitting the sound through the bone requires a great amount of power. Bone conduction aids generally have a poorer high pitch response and are therefore best used for conductive hearing losses or where it is impractical to fit standard hearing aids.

==== Air conduction spectacles ====
Unlike the bone conduction spectacles the sound is transmitted via hearing aids which are attached to the arm or arms of the spectacles. When removing your glasses for cleaning, the hearing aids are detached at the same time. Whilst there are genuine instances where spectacle aids are a preferred choice, they may not always be the most practical option.

==== Directional spectacles ====
These 'hearing glasses' incorporate a directional microphone capability: four microphones on each side of the frame effectively work as two directional microphones, which are able to discern between sound coming from the front and sound coming from the sides or back of the user. This improves the signal-to-noise ratio by allowing for amplification of the sound coming from the front, the direction in which the user is looking, and active noise control for sounds coming from the sides or behind. Only very recently has the technology required become small enough to be fitted in the frame of the glasses. As a recent addition to the market, this new hearing aid is currently available only in the Netherlands and Belgium.

=== Stethoscope ===
These hearing aids are designed for medical practitioners with hearing loss who use stethoscopes. The hearing aid is built into the speaker of the stethoscope, which amplifies the sound.

=== Hearing aid applications ===
Hearing aid applications (HAA) are software which, when installed on mobile computational platforms, transforms them into hearing aids.

The principle of HAA operation corresponds to the basic principles of operation of traditional hearing aids: the microphone receives an acoustic signal and converts it into a digital form. Sound amplification is achieved by the means of a mobile computational platform, in accordance with the degree and type of the user's hearing loss. The processed audio signal is transformed into an audio signal and output to the user into the headphones/headset. Signal processing is implemented in real time.

Constructional features of mobile computational platforms imply preferred use of stereo headsets with two speakers, which allows carrying out binaural hearing correction for the left and right ear separately. HAAs can work with both wired and wireless headsets and headphones.

As a rule, HAAs have two operation modes: setup mode and hearing aid mode. Setup mode involves the user passing an in situ-audiometry procedure, which determines the user's hearing characteristics. Hearing aid mode is a hearing correction system that corrects the user's hearing in accordance with the user's hearing thresholds. HAAs also incorporate background noise suppression and acoustic feedback suppression.

The user can independently choose a formula to enhance the sound, as well as adjust the level of the desired amplification to their wishes.

HAAs have several advantages (compared to traditional hearing aids):

- HAAs do not cause any psychological inconvenience;
- it is possible to achieve the highest sound pressure level and get high sound quality (due to large speakers and a long battery life);
- it is possible to use more complex audio signal processing algorithms and a higher sampling rate (because of capacious battery);
- the possibility to implement more convenient application control functions for people with poor motor skills;
- resistance to ingress of earwax and moisture;
- software flexibility;
- the large distance between the microphone and the speaker prevents the occurrence of acoustic feedback;
- the set up of HAAs in simple cases does not require special equipment and qualifications;
- the user does not need to purchase and carry any separate device;
- various types of headphones and headsets can be used.

HAAs also have some disadvantages (compared to traditional hearing aids):

- because the microphone is not located in the ear, it does not use the functional advantages of the auricle and the natural acoustics of the outer ear.
- they are more noticeable and less comfortable to wear.

== Technology ==
The first electrical hearing aid used the carbon microphone of the telephone and was introduced in 1896. The vacuum tube made electronic amplification possible, but early versions of amplified hearing aids were too heavy to carry around. Miniaturization of vacuum tubes lead to portable models, and after World War II, wearable models using miniature tubes. The transistor invented in 1948 was well suited to the hearing aid application due to low power and small size; hearing aids were an early adopter of transistors. The development of integrated circuits allowed further improvement of the capabilities of wearable aids, including implementation of digital signal processing techniques and programmability for the individual user's needs.

=== Compatibility with telephones ===
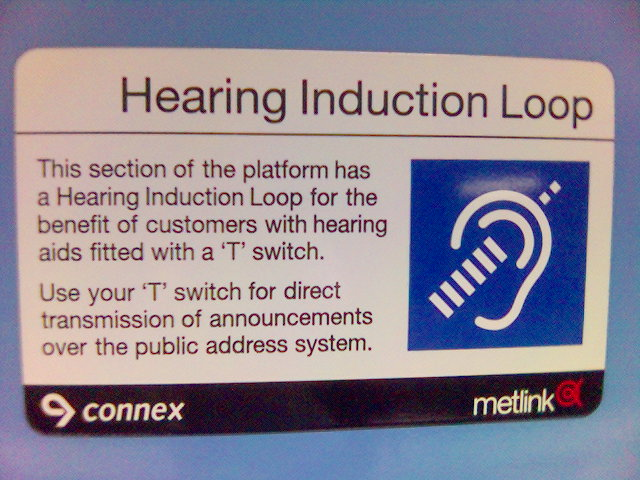
A sign in a train station explains that the public announcement system uses a "Hearing Induction Loop" (audio induction loop). Hearing aid users can use a telecoil (T) switch to hear announcements directly through their hearing aid receiver.

A hearing aid and a telephone are "compatible" when they can connect to each other in a way that produces clear, easily understood sound. The term "compatibility" is applied to all three types of telephones (wired, cordless, and mobile). There are two ways telephones and hearing aids can connect with each other:

- Acoustically: the sound from the phone's speaker is picked up by the hearing aid's microphone.
- Electromagnetically: the signal inside the phone's speaker is picked up by the hearing aid's "telecoil" or "T-coil", a special loop of wire inside the hearing aid.

Note that telecoil coupling has nothing to do with the radio signal in a cellular or cordless phone: the audio signal picked up by the telecoil is the weak electromagnetic field that is generated by the voice coil in the phone's speaker as it pushes the speaker cone back and forth.

The electromagnetic (telecoil) mode is usually more effective than the acoustic method. This is mainly because the microphone is often automatically switched off when the hearing aid is operating in telecoil mode, so background noise is not amplified. Since there is an electronic connection to the phone, the sound is clearer and distortion is less likely. But in order for this to work, the phone has to be hearing-aid compatible. More technically, the phone's speaker has to have a voice coil that generates a relatively strong electromagnetic field. Speakers with strong voice coils are more expensive and require more energy than the tiny ones used in many modern telephones; phones with the small low-power speakers cannot couple electromagnetically with the telecoil in the hearing aid, so the hearing aid must then switch to acoustic mode. Also, many mobile phones emit high levels of electromagnetic noise that creates audible static in the hearing aid when the telecoil is used. A workaround that resolves this issue on many mobile phones is to plug a wired (not Bluetooth) headset into the mobile phone; with the headset placed near the hearing aid the phone can be held far enough away to attenuate the static. Another method is to use a "neckloop" (which is like a portable, around-the-neck induction loop), and plug the neckloop directly into the standard audio jack (headphones jack) of a smartphone (or laptop, or stereo, etc.). Then, with the hearing aids' telecoil turned on (usually a button to press), the sound will travel directly from the phone, through the neckloop and into the hearing aids' telecoils.

On 21 March 2007, the Telecommunications Industry Association issued the TIA-1083 standard, which gives manufacturers of cordless telephones the ability to test their products for compatibility with most hearing aids that have a T-Coil magnetic coupling mode. With this testing, digital cordless phone manufacturers will be able to inform consumers about which products will work with their hearing aids.

The American National Standards Institute (ANSI) has a ratings scale for compatibility between hearing aids and phones:

- When operating in acoustic (Microphone) mode, the ratings are from M1 (worst) to M4 (best).
- When operating in electromagnetic (Telecoil) mode, the ratings are from T1 (worst) to T4 (best).

The best possible rating is M4/T4 meaning that the phone works well in both modes. Devices rated below M3 are unsatisfactory for people with hearing aids.

Computer programs that allow the creation of a hearing aid using a PC, tablet or smartphone are currently gaining in popularity. Modern mobile devices have all the necessary components to implement this: hardware (an ordinary microphone and headphones may be used) and a high-performance microprocessor that carries digital sound processing according to a given algorithm. Application configuration is carried out by the user themselves in accordance with the individual features of their hearing ability. The computational power of modern mobile devices is sufficient to produce the best sound quality. This, coupled with software application settings (for example, profile selection according to a sound environment) provides for high comfort and convenience of use. In comparison with the digital hearing aid, mobile applications have the following advantages:

- acoustic gain is up to 30 dB (with a standard headset);
- complete invisibility (smartphone is not associated with a hearing aid);
- ease of use (no need to use additional devices, batteries and so on.);
- Fast switching between the external headset and phone microphone;
- free distribution of applications.
- High duration of the battery;
- high sampling frequency (44.1 kHz) providing for excellent sound quality;
- high wearing comfort;
- low delay in audio processing (from 6,3 to 15,7 ms – depending on the mobile device model);
- No loss of settings when switching from one gadget to another and back again;
- No need to get used to it, when changing mobile devices;
- user-friendly interface of software settings;

It should be clearly understood that "hearing aid" application for smartphone / tablet cannot be considered a complete substitution of a digital hearing aid, since the latter:

- is a medical device (exposed to the relevant procedures of testing and certification);
- is adjusted using audiometry procedures.
- is designed for use by doctor's prescription;

Functionality of hearing aid applications may involve a hearing test (in situ audiometry) too. However, the results of the test are used only to adjust the device for comfortable working with the application. The procedure of hearing testing in any way cannot claim to replace an audiometry test carried out by a medical specialist, so cannot be a basis for diagnosis.

- Apps such as Oticon ON for certain iOS (Apple) and Android devices can assist in locating a lost/misplaced hearing aid.

=== Wireless ===
Recent hearing aids include wireless hearing aids. One hearing aid can transmit to the other side so that pressing one aid's program button simultaneously changes the other aid, so that both aids change background settings simultaneously. FM listening systems are now emerging with wireless receivers integrated with the use of hearing aids. A separate wireless microphone can be given to a partner to wear in a restaurant, in the car, during leisure time, in the shopping mall, at lectures, or during religious services. The voice is transmitted wirelessly to the hearing aids eliminating the effects of distance and background noise. FM systems have shown to give the best speech understanding in noise of all available technologies. FM systems can also be hooked up to a TV or a stereo.

2.4 gigahertz Bluetooth connectivity is the most recent innovation in wireless interfacing for hearing instruments to audio sources such as TV streamers or Bluetooth enabled mobile phones. Current hearing aids generally do not stream directly via Bluetooth but rather do so through a secondary streaming device (usually worn around the neck or in a pocket), this bluetooth enabled secondary device then streams wirelessly to the hearing aid but can only do so over a short distance. This technology can be applied to ready-to-wear devices (BTE, Mini BTE, RIE, etc.) or to custom made devices that fit directly into the ear.

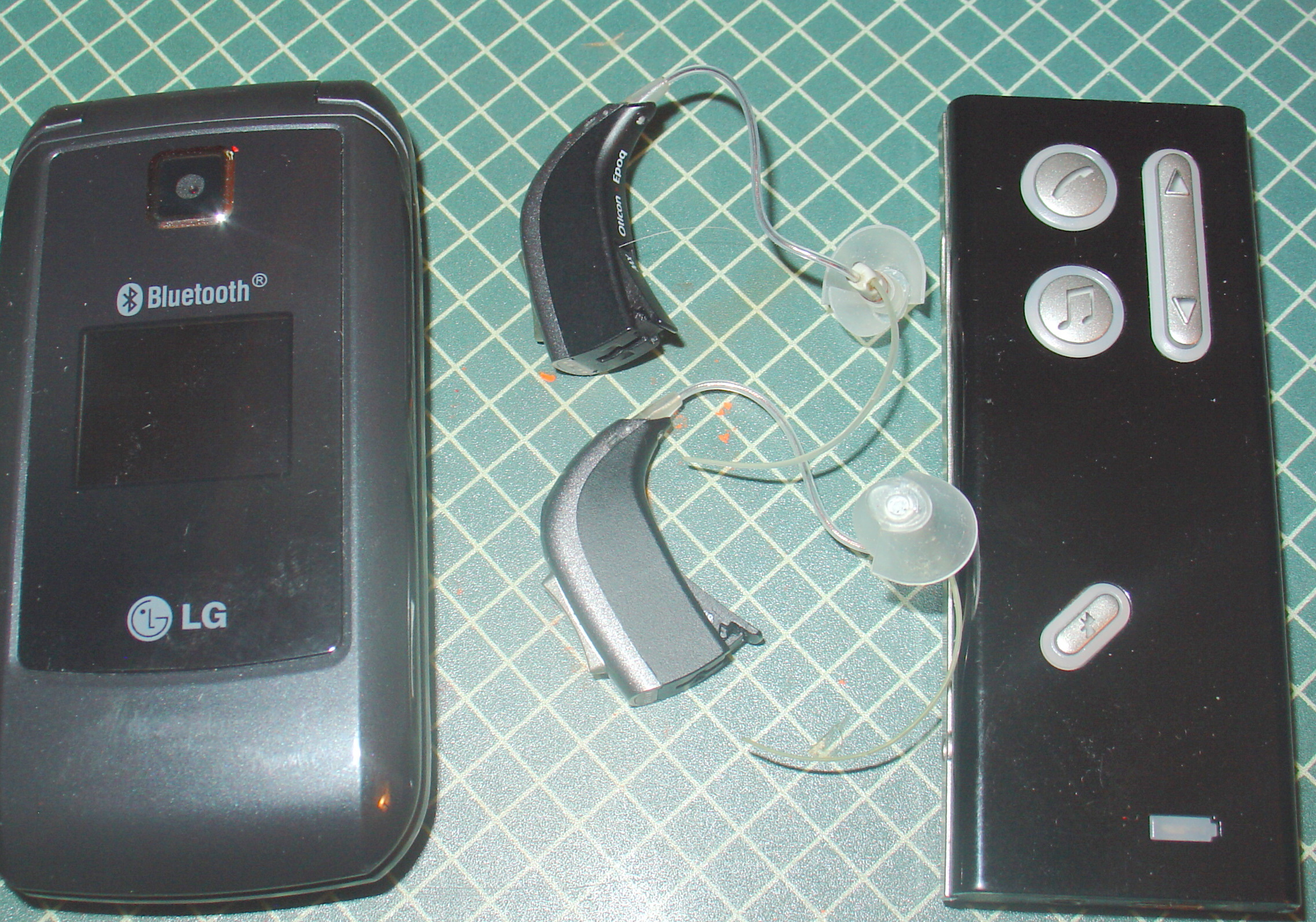
Oticon hearing aids for use with Bluetooth wireless devices

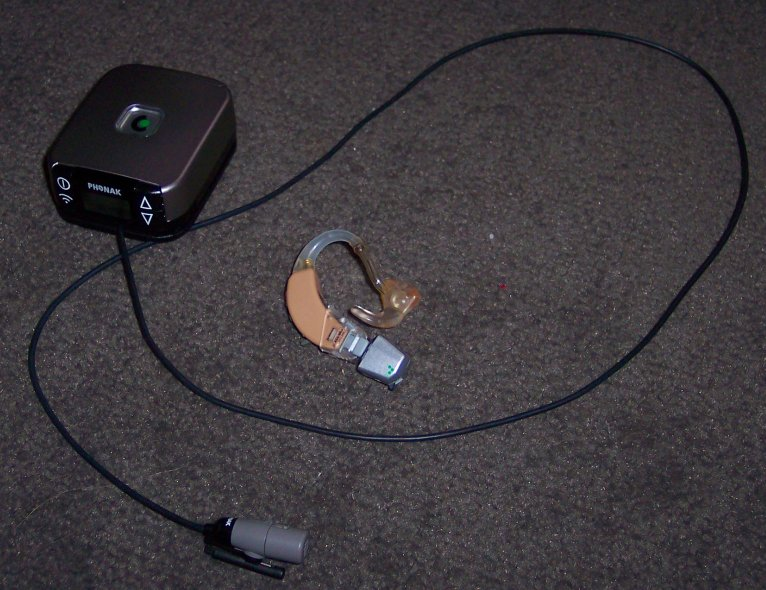
Phonak wireless FM system

In developed countries FM systems are considered a cornerstone in the treatment of hearing loss in children. More and more adults discover the benefits of wireless FM systems as well, especially since transmitters with different microphone settings and Bluetooth for wireless cell phone communication have become available.

Many theatres and lecture halls are now equipped with assistive listening systems that transmit the sound directly from the stage; audience members can borrow suitable receivers and hear the program without background noise. In some theatres and churches FM transmitters are available that work with the personal FM receivers of hearing instruments.

=== Directional microphone ===
Most older hearing aids have only an omnidirectional microphone. An omnidirectional microphone amplifies sounds equally from all directions. In contrast, a directional microphone amplifies sounds from one direction more than sounds from other directions. This means that sounds originating from the direction the system is steered toward are amplified more than sounds coming from other directions. If the desired speech arrives from the direction of steering and the noise is from a different direction, then compared to an omnidirectional microphone, a directional microphone provides a better signal-to-noise ratio. Improving the signal-to-noise ratio improves speech understanding in noise. Directional microphones have been found to be the second best method to improve the signal-to-noise ratio (the best method was an FM system, which locates the microphone near the mouth of the desired talker).

Many hearing aids have both an omnidirectional and a directional microphone mode. This is because the wearer may not need or desire the noise-reducing properties of the directional microphone in a given situation. Typically, the omnidirectional microphone mode is used in quiet listening situations (e.g. living room) whereas the directional microphone is used in noisy listening situations (e.g. restaurant). The microphone mode is typically selected manually by the wearer. Some hearing aids automatically switch the microphone mode.

Adaptive directional microphones automatically vary the direction of maximum amplification or rejection (to reduce an interfering directional sound source). The direction of amplification or rejection is varied by the hearing aid processor. The processor attempts to provide maximum amplification in the direction of the desired speech signal source or rejection in the direction of the interfering signal source. Unless the user manually temporarily switches to a "restaurant program, forward only mode" adaptive directional microphones frequently amplify the speech of other talkers in a cocktail party type environments, such as restaurants or coffee shops; this can also be helpful during business meetings. The presence of multiple speech signals makes it difficult for the processor to correctly select the desired speech signal. Another disadvantage is that some noises often contain characteristics similar to speech, making it difficult for the hearing aid processor to distinguish the speech from the noise. Despite the disadvantages, adaptive directional microphones can provide improved speech recognition in noise.

FM systems have been found to provide a better signal-to-noise ratio even at larger speaker-to-talker distances in simulated testing conditions.

=== Telecoil ===
Generic international symbol for a telecoil service, showing a stylised ear and the letter T

Telecoils or T-coils (from "Telephone Coils") are small devices installed in hearing aids or cochlear implants. An audio induction loop generates an electromagnetic field that can be detected by T-coils, allowing audio sources to be directly connected to a hearing aid. The T-coil is intended to help the wearer filter out background noise. They can be used with telephones, FM systems (with neck loops), and induction loop systems (also called "hearing loops") that transmit sound to hearing aids from public address systems and TVs. In the UK and the Nordic countries, hearing loops are widely used in churches, shops, railway stations, and other public places.

A T-coil consists of a metal core (or rod) around which ultra-fine wire is coiled. T-coils are also called induction coils because when the coil is placed in a magnetic field, an alternating electric current is induced in the wire (Ross, 2002b; Ross, 2004). The T-coil detects magnetic energy and transduces (converts) it to electrical energy. In the United States, the Telecommunications Industry Association's TIA-1083 standard, specifies how analog handsets can interact with telecoil devices, to ensure the optimal performance.

Although T-coils are effectively a wide-band receiver, interference is unusual in most hearing loop situations. Interference can manifest as a buzzing sound, which varies in volume depending on the distance the wearer is from the source. Sources are electromagnetic fields, such as CRT computer monitors, older fluorescent lighting, some dimmer switches, many household electrical appliances and airplanes. A more recent technology, Auracast, uses Bluetooth instead.

==== Legislation affecting use ====
In the United States, the Hearing Aid Compatibility Act of 1988 requires that the Federal Communications Commission (FCC) ensure that all telephones manufactured or imported for use in the United States after August 1989, and all "essential" telephones, be hearing aid-compatible (through the use of a telecoil).

"Essential" phones are defined as "coin-operated telephones, telephones provided for emergency use, and other telephones frequently needed for use by persons using such hearing aids." These might include workplace telephones, telephones in confined settings (like hospitals and nursing homes), and telephones in hotel and motel rooms. Secure telephones, as well as telephones used with public mobile and private radio services, are exempt from the HAC Act. "Secure" phones are defined as "telephones that are approved by the U.S. Government for the transmission of classified or sensitive voice communications."

In 2003, the FCC adopted rules to make digital wireless telephones compatible with hearing aids and cochlear implants. Although analog wireless phones do not usually cause interference with hearing aids or cochlear implants, digital wireless phones often do because of electromagnetic energy emitted by the phone's antenna, backlight, or other components. The FCC has set a timetable for the development and sale of digital wireless telephones that are compatible with hearing aids. This effort promises to increase the number of digital wireless telephones that are hearing aid-compatible. Older generations of both cordless and mobile phones used analog technology.

=== Audio boot ===
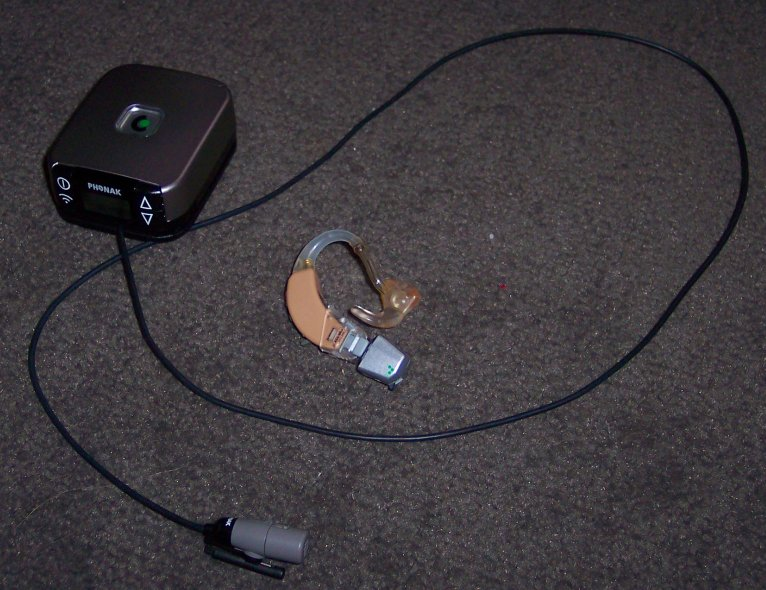
A hearing aid with an audio boot

An audio boot or audio shoe is an electronic device used with hearing aids; hearing aids often come with a special set of metal contacts for audio input. Typically the audio boot will fit around the end of the hearing aid (a behind-the-ear model, as in-the-ear do not afford any purchase for the connection) to link it with another device, like an FM system or a cellphone or even a digital audio player.

=== Direct audio input ===
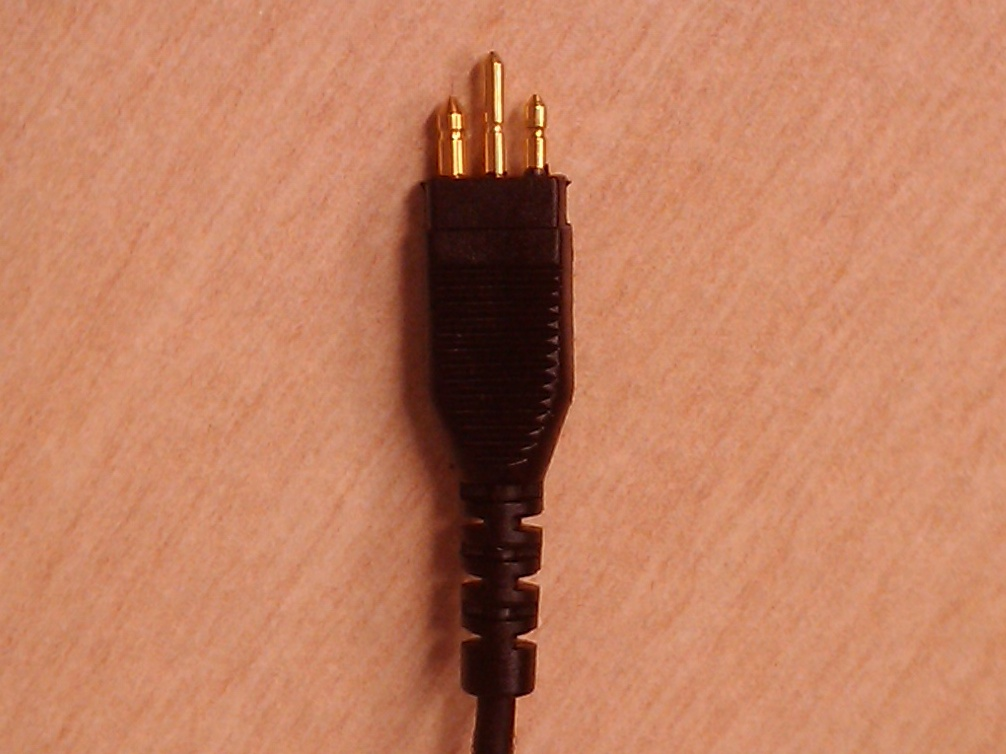
A DAI plug on the end of a cable

Direct audio input (DAI) allows the hearing aid to be directly connected to an external audio source like a CD player or an assistive listening device (ALD). By its very nature, DAI is susceptible to far less electromagnetic interference, and yields a better quality audio signal as opposed to using a T-coil with standard headphones. An audio boot is a type of device that may be used to facilitate DAI.

=== Processing ===
Every electronic hearing aid has at minimum a microphone, a loudspeaker (commonly called a receiver), a battery, and electronic circuitry. The electronic circuitry varies among devices, even if they are the same style. The circuitry falls into three categories based on the type of audio processing (analog or digital) and the type of control circuitry (adjustable or programmable). Hearing aid devices generally do not contain processors strong enough to process complex signal algorithms for sound source localization.

==== Analog ====
Analog audio may have:

- Adjustable control: The audio circuit is analog with electronic components that can be adjusted. The hearing professional determines the gain and other specifications required for the wearer, and then adjusts the analog components either with small controls on the hearing aid itself or by having a laboratory build the hearing aid to meet those specifications. After the adjustment the resulting audio does not change any further, other than overall loudness that the wearer adjusts with a volume control. This type of circuitry is generally the least flexible. The first practical electronic hearing aid with adjustable analog audio circuitry was based on US Patent 2,017,358, "Hearing Aid Apparatus and Amplifier" by Samual Gordon Taylor, filed in 1932.
- Programmable control: The audio circuit is analog but with additional electronic control circuitry that can be programmed by an audiologist, often with more than one program. The electronic control circuitry can be fixed during manufacturing or in some cases, the hearing professional can use an external computer temporarily connected to the hearing aid to program the additional control circuitry. The wearer can change the program for different listening environments by pressing buttons either on the device itself or on a remote control or in some cases the additional control circuitry operates automatically. This type of circuitry is generally more flexible than simple adjustable controls. The first hearing aid with analog audio circuitry and automatic digital electronic control circuitry was based on US Patent 4,025,721, "Method of and means for adaptively filtering near-stationary noise from speech" by D Graupe, GD Causey, filed in 1975. This digital electronic control circuitry was used to identify and automatically reduce noise in individual frequency channels of the analog audio circuits and was known as the Zeta Noise Blocker.

==== Digital ====
Block diagram of digital hearing aid

Digital audio, programmable control: Both the audio circuit and the additional control circuits are fully digital. The hearing professional programs the hearing aid with an external computer temporarily connected to the device and can adjust all processing characteristics on an individual basis. Fully digital circuitry allows implementation of many additional features not possible with analog circuitry, can be used in all styles of hearing aids and is the most flexible; for example, digital hearing aids can be programmed to amplify certain frequencies more than others, and can provide better sound quality than analog hearing aids. Fully digital hearing aids can be programmed with multiple programs that can be invoked by the wearer, or that operate automatically and adaptively. These programs reduce acoustic feedback (whistling), reduce background noise, detect and automatically accommodate different listening environments (loud vs. soft, speech vs. music, quiet vs. noisy, etc.), control additional components such as multiple microphones to improve spatial hearing, transpose frequencies (shift high frequencies that a wearer may not hear to lower frequency regions where hearing may be better), and implement many other features. Fully digital circuitry also allows control over wireless transmission capability for both the audio and the control circuitry. Control signals in a hearing aid on one ear can be sent wirelessly to the control circuitry in the hearing aid on the opposite ear to ensure that the audio in both ears is either matched directly or that the audio contains intentional differences that mimic the differences in normal binaural hearing to preserve spatial hearing ability. Audio signals can be sent wirelessly to and from external devices through a separate module, often a small device worn like a pendant and commonly called a "streamer", that allows wireless connection to yet other external devices. This capability allows optimal use of mobile telephones, personal music players, remote microphones and other devices. With the addition of speech recognition and internet capability in the mobile phone, the wearer has optimal communication ability in many more situations than with hearing aids alone. This growing list includes voice activated dialing, voice activated software applications either on the phone or on the internet, receipt of audio signals from databases on the phone or on internet, or audio signals from television sets or from global positioning systems. The first practical, wearable, fully digital hearing aid was invented by Maynard Engebretson, Robert E Morley Jr. and Gerald R Popelka. Their work resulted in US Patent 4,548,082, "Hearing aids, signal supplying apparatus, systems for compensating hearing deficiencies, and methods" by A Maynard Engebretson, Robert E Morley Jr. and Gerald R Popelka, filed in 1984. This patent formed the basis of all subsequent fully digital hearing aids from all manufacturers, including those produced currently.

The signal processing is performed by the microprocessor in real time and taking into account the individual preferences of the user (for example, increasing bass for better speech perception in noisy environments, or selective amplification of high frequencies for people with reduced sensibility to this range). The microprocessor automatically analyzes the nature of the external background noise and adapts the signal processing to the specific conditions (as well as to its change, for example, when the user goes outside from the building).

In speech enhancement, for example using neural networks, finds application in hearing aids. Problems may arise if these methods filter out emergency sounds such as fire alarms and car horns.

==== Difference between digital and analog hearing aids ====
Analogue hearing aids make all the sounds picked up by the microphone louder. For example, speech and ambient noise will be made louder together. On the other hand, digital hearing aid (DHA) technology processes the sound using digital technology. Before transmitting the sound to the speaker, the DHA microprocessor processes the digital signal received by the microphone according to an algorithm. This allows certain-frequency sounds to be made louder according to the individual user's settings (personal audiogram), and the DHA can automatically adjust to various environments (noisy streets, quiet room, concert hall, etc.).

For users with varying degrees of hearing loss, it is difficult to perceive the entire frequency range of external sounds. DHAs with multi-channel digital processing allow a user to "compose" the output sound by fitting a whole spectrum of the input signal into it. This gives users with limited hearing abilities the opportunity to perceive the whole range of ambient sounds, despite the personal difficulties of perception of certain frequencies. Moreover, even in this "narrow" range the DHA microprocessor is able to emphasize desired sounds (e.g. speech), lowering unwanted loud, high, etc., sounds at the same time.

According to research DHAs have a number of significant advantages compared to analogue hearing aids:

- "Self-learning" and adaptive adjustment. They can implement adaptive selection of amplification parameters and processing.
- Effective acoustic feedback reduction. The acoustic whistling common to all hearing aids can be adaptively controlled.
- Effective use of directional microphones. Directional microphones can be adaptively controlled.
- Extended frequency range. A larger range of frequencies can be implemented with frequency shifting.
- Flexibility in selective amplification. They can provide more flexibility in frequency specific amplification to match the individual hearing characteristics of the user.
- Improved connection to other devices. Connection to other devices such as smartphones and televisions is possible.
- Noise reduction. They can reduce the background noise level to increase user comfort in noisy environments.
- Speech recognition. They can distinguish the speech signal from the overall spectrum of sounds, which facilitates speech perception.

These advantages of DHAs were confirmed by a number of studies relating to the comparative analysis of digital hearing aids of second and first generations and analog hearing aids.

==== Difference between digital hearing aids and hearing aid applications ====
Smartphones have all the necessary hardware to perform the functions of a digital hearing aid: microphone, AD converter, digital processor, DA converter, amplifier, and speakers. External microphone and speakers can also be connected as a special headset.

The operational principles of hearing aid applications correspond to general operational principles of digital hearing aids: the microphone perceives an acoustic signal and converts it to digital form. Sound amplification is achieved through hardware and software in accordance with the user's hearing characteristics. Then, the signal is converted to analog form and received in the headphones by the user. The signal is processed in real time.

Stereo headsets with two speakers can be used, which allows separate binaural hearing correction for the left and right ear.

Unlike digital hearing aids, the adjustment of hearing aid applications is an integral part of the application itself. Hearing aid applications are adjusted in accordance with the user's audiogram. The whole adjustment process is automated so that the user can perform audiometry on their own.

The hearing correction application has two modes: audiometry and correction. In the audiometry mode, hearing thresholds are measured. In the correction mode, the signal is processed with respect to the obtained thresholds.

Hearing aid applications also provide for different computational formulas for the calculation of sound amplification based on the audiometry data. These formulas are intended for maximum comfortable speech amplification and best sound intelligibility.

Hearing aid applications allow the user to save different user profiles for different acoustic environments. Thus, in contrast to the static settings of digital hearing aids, the user can quickly switch between the profiles depending on the acoustic environment.

One of the most important characteristics of the hearing aid is acoustic feedback. In hearing aid applications, there is a significant hardware delay, so hearing aid applications use a signal processing scheme with the minimum possible algorithmic delay to make it as short as possible.

== Difference between PSAP and digital hearing aids ==
Personal sound amplification products (PSAP) are classified by the FDA as "personal sound amplification devices". These compact electronic devices are designed for people without hearing loss. Unlike hearing aids (which the FDA classifies as devices to compensate for hearing impairment), the use of PSAP does not require a medical prescription. Such devices are used by hunters, naturalists (for audio observation of animals or birds), ordinary people (for example, to increase the volume of the TV in a quiet room), etc. PSAP models differ significantly in price and functionality. Some devices simply amplify sound. Others contain directional microphones, equalizers to adjust the audio signal gain and filter noise. In modern days, some people refer to these devices as OTC hearing aids.

== Evolution of hearing aid applications ==
There are audio players designed specifically for the hard-of-hearing. These applications amplify the volume of the reproduced audio signal in accordance with the user's hearing characteristics and act as a music volume amplifier and assistive hearing aid. The amplification algorithm works on the frequencies that the user hears worse, thus restoring natural hearing perception of the sound of music.

Just as in hearing aid applications, the player adjustment is based on the user's audiogram.

There are also applications that not only adapt the sound of music but also include some hearing aid functions. Such applications include a sound amplification mode in accordance with the user's hearing characteristics as well as a noise suppression mode and a mode allowing the user to hear ambient sound without pausing the music.

Also, some applications allow the hard-of-hearing to watch video and listen to the radio with comfort. The operational principles of these applications are similar to those of hearing aid applications: the audio signal is amplified on the frequencies that the user hears worse.

== Hearing aid adaptation ==
A person using a hearing aid for the first time often cannot make use of all of its advantages quickly. The structure and characteristics of hearing aids are designed by specialists in order to make the adjustment period as simple and quick as possible. However, despite this, a beginning hearing aid user typically still needs time to get used to it.

The process of adjusting to hearing prostheses consists of the following steps:

- Initial adjustment of the device
- Fine adjustments
- Adaptation to the new sound

Due to the plasticity of the central nervous system, inactive hearing centers in the brain's cortex switch over to processing auditory stimuli in another frequency and intensity. The brain starts to perceive sounds amplified by the hearing aid immediately after the initial adjustment; however, it may not process them correctly right away.

Feeling the hearing aid in the ear may seem unusual. It also takes time to adapt to a new way of hearing. The ear has to be gradually adjusted to the new sound. The sound may seem unnatural, metallic, too loud or too quiet. A whistling sound may also appear, which can be unpleasant.

Hearing aids do not provide immediate improvement. The adjustment period can last from several hours to several months.

Patients are offered an initial schedule to wear their hearing aid, ensuring gradual adaptation to it. Users are recommended to regularly visit an audiologist, including for the purposes of additional hearing aid adjustment.

== History ==
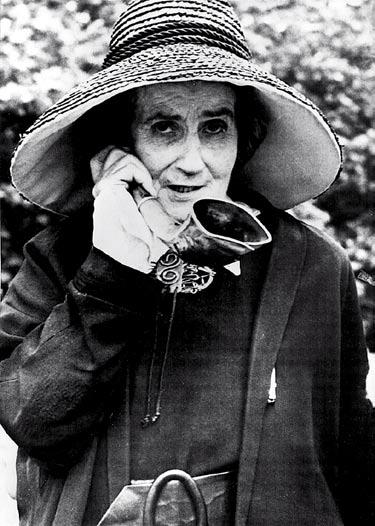
Madame de Meuron with ear trumpet

The first hearing aids were ear trumpets, and were created in the 17th century. Some of the first hearing aids were external hearing aids. External hearing aids directed sounds in front of the ear and blocked all other noises. The apparatus would fit behind or in the ear.

The movement toward modern hearing aids began with the creation of the telephone, and the first electric hearing aid, the "akouphone", was created about 1895 by Miller Reese Hutchison. In 1920, Earl C. Hanson patented the first vacuum tube hearing aid to be produced commercially, known as the “Vactuphone”. Manufactured by the Western Electric Company, and distributed by the Globe Phone Manufacturing Company, it came to the market in October of 1921. By the late 20th century, digital hearing aids were commercially available.

The invention of the carbon microphone, transmitters, digital signal processing chip or DSP, and the development of computer technology helped transform the hearing aid to its present form.

=== History of digital aids ===
The history of DHA can be divided into three stages. The first stage began in the 1960s with the widespread use of digital computers for simulation of audio processing and for the analysis of systems and algorithms. The work was conducted with the help of the very large digital computers of that era. These efforts were not actual digital hearing aids because the computers were not fast enough for audio processing in real time and their size prevented them from being described as wearable, but they allowed successful studies of the various hardware circuits and algorithms for digital processing of audio signals. The software package Block of Compiled Diagrams (BLODI) developed by Kelly, Lockbaum and Vysotskiy in 1961 allowed simulation of any sound system that could be characterized in the form of a block diagram. A special phone was created so that a person with a hearing impairment could listen to the digitally processed signals, but not in real time. In 1967, Harry Levitt used BLODI to simulate a hearing aid on a digital computer.

Almost ten years later the second stage began with the creation of the hybrid hearing aid, in which the analog components of a conventional hearing aid consisting of amplifiers, filters and signal limiting were combined with a separate digital programmable component in a conventional hearing aid case. The audio processing remained analog but it was controlled by the digital programmable component. The digital component could be programmed by connecting the device to an external computer in the laboratory then disconnected to allow the hybrid device to function as a conventional wearable hearing aid.

The hybrid device was effective from a practical point of view because of the low power consumption and compact size. At that time, low-power analog amplifier technology was well developed in contrast to the available semiconductor chips able to process digital audio in real time. The combination of high performance analog components for real time audio processing and a separate low power digital programmable component only for controlling the analog signal led to the creation of several low power digital programmable components able to implement different types of control.

A hybrid hearing aid was developed by Etymotic Design. A little later, Mangold and Lane created a programmable multi-channel hybrid hearing aid. Graupe with co-authors developed a digital programmable component that implemented an adaptive noise filter.

The third stage began in the early 1980s by a research group at Central Institute for the Deaf headed up by faculty members at Washington University in St. Louis. This group created the first fully digital wearable hearing aid. They first conceived a complete, comprehensive full digital hearing aid, then designed and fabricated, miniaturized full digital computer chips using custom digital signal processing chips with low power and very large scale integrated (VLSI) chip technology able to process both the audio signal in real time and the control signals, yet able to be powered by a battery and be fully wearable as a full digital wearable hearing aid able to be actually used by individuals with hearing loss in real-world environments. Engebretson, Morley and Popelka were the inventors of the first full digital hearing aid. Their work resulted in US Patent 4,548,082, "Hearing aids, signal supplying apparatus, systems for compensating hearing deficiencies, and methods" by A Maynard Engebretson, Robert E Morley Jr. and Gerald R Popelka, filed in 1984 and issued in 1985. This full digital wearable hearing aid also included many additional features now used in all contemporary full digital hearing aids including a bidirectional interface with an external computer, self-calibration, self-adjustment, wide bandwidth, digital programmability, a fitting algorithm based on audibility, internal storage of digital programs, and fully digital multichannel amplitude compression and output limiting. This group created several of these full digital hearing aids and used them for research on hearing impaired people as they wore them in the same manner as conventional hearing aids in real-world situations. In this first full DHA all stages of sound processing and control were carried out in binary form. The external sound was picked up by a microphone positioned in an ITE ear module to take advantage of the acoustic effects of the pinna, then converted into binary code, digitally processed and digitally controlled in real time, then converted back to an analog signal sent to two miniature loudspeakers positioned in the same ITE ear module. The ITE module also contained an inward facing microphone to measure the sound actually generated in the ear canal, a precursor to separate probe tube measures now routinely used for hearing aid fitting. The necessary electronic components, including batteries, to support this arrangement were situated in a BTE module that could be supplemented with a body worn module. These specialized hearing aid chips continued to become smaller, increase in computational ability and require even less power. Now, virtually all commercial hearing aids are fully digital and their digital signal processing capability has significantly increased. Very small and very low power specialized digital hearing aid chips are now used in all hearing aids manufactured worldwide. Many additional new features also have been added with various on-board advanced wireless technology.

== Regulation ==
=== Canada ===
Hearing aids are Class II regulated medical devices under Canada's Food and Drugs Act.

Under Health Canada, the Medical Devices Directorate (MDD) regulates the safety, quality, and effectiveness of hearing aids. All hearing aids imported and sold in Canada are subject to a pre-market review. Post-market, Health Canada monitors the performance of the hearing aid and any consumer complaints.

In Canada, a prescription is required to purchase hearing aids. Only licensed audiologists, Ear, Nose and Throat (ENT) doctors, hearing instrument practitioners (where the profession exists), and audioprothésistes (in Quebec) (Note: Although audioprothésistes are allowed to administer hearing tests, to prevents conflicts of interest, the healthcare system will no compensate hearing aids if the test was not performed by an audiologist.) can prescribe hearing aids. Over-the-counter (OTC) hearing aids are currently not available for sale in Canada.

Canadian taxpayers can claim tax relief for hearing aids as a medical expense.

=== Ireland ===
Like much of the Irish health care system, hearing aid provision is a mixture of public and private.

Hearing aids are provided by the state to children, old-age pensions and to people whose income is at or below that of the state pension.

Hearing aids are also available privately, and there is grant assistance available for insured workers. For the fiscal year ending 2016, the grant stands at a maximum of €500 per ear.

Irish taxpayers can also claim tax relief at the standard rate as hearing aids are recognised as a medical device.

Hearing aids in the Republic of Ireland are exempt from VAT.

Hearing aid providers in Ireland mostly belong to the Irish Society of Hearing Aid Audiologists.

=== United States ===
Ordinary hearing aids are Class I regulated medical devices under Federal Food and Drug Administration (FDA) rules. A 1976 statute explicitly prohibits any state requirement that is "different from, or in addition to, any requirement applicable" to regulated medical devices (which includes hearing aids) which relates "to the safety and effectiveness of the device". Inconsistent state regulation is preempted under the federal law. In the late 1970s, the FDA established federal rules governing hearing aid sales, and addressed various requests by state authorities for exemptions from federal preemption, granting some and denying others. The Over-the-Counter Hearing Aid Act (OTC Act) was passed under the FDA Reauthorization Act of 2017, creating a class of hearing aids regulated by the FDA available directly to consumers without involvement from a licensed professional. This law's provisions are expected to go into effect in 2020.

In August 2022, the FDA issued a final rule to improve access to hearing aids. The action establishes a new category of over-the-counter (OTC) hearing aids, enabling consumers with perceived mild to moderate hearing impairment to purchase hearing aids directly from stores or online retailers without the need for a medical exam, prescription or a fitting adjustment by an audiologist. The FDA action amends existing rules that apply to prescription hearing aids for consistency with the new OTC category, it repeals the conditions for sale for hearing aids, and it includes provisions that address some of the effects of the FDA OTC hearing aid regulations on state regulation of hearing aids. The FDA also issued the final guidance, Regulatory Requirements for Hearing Aid Devices and Personal Sound Amplification Products (PSAPs), to clarify the differences between hearing aids, which are medical devices, and PSAPs, consumer products that help people with normal hearing amplify sounds.

== Cost ==
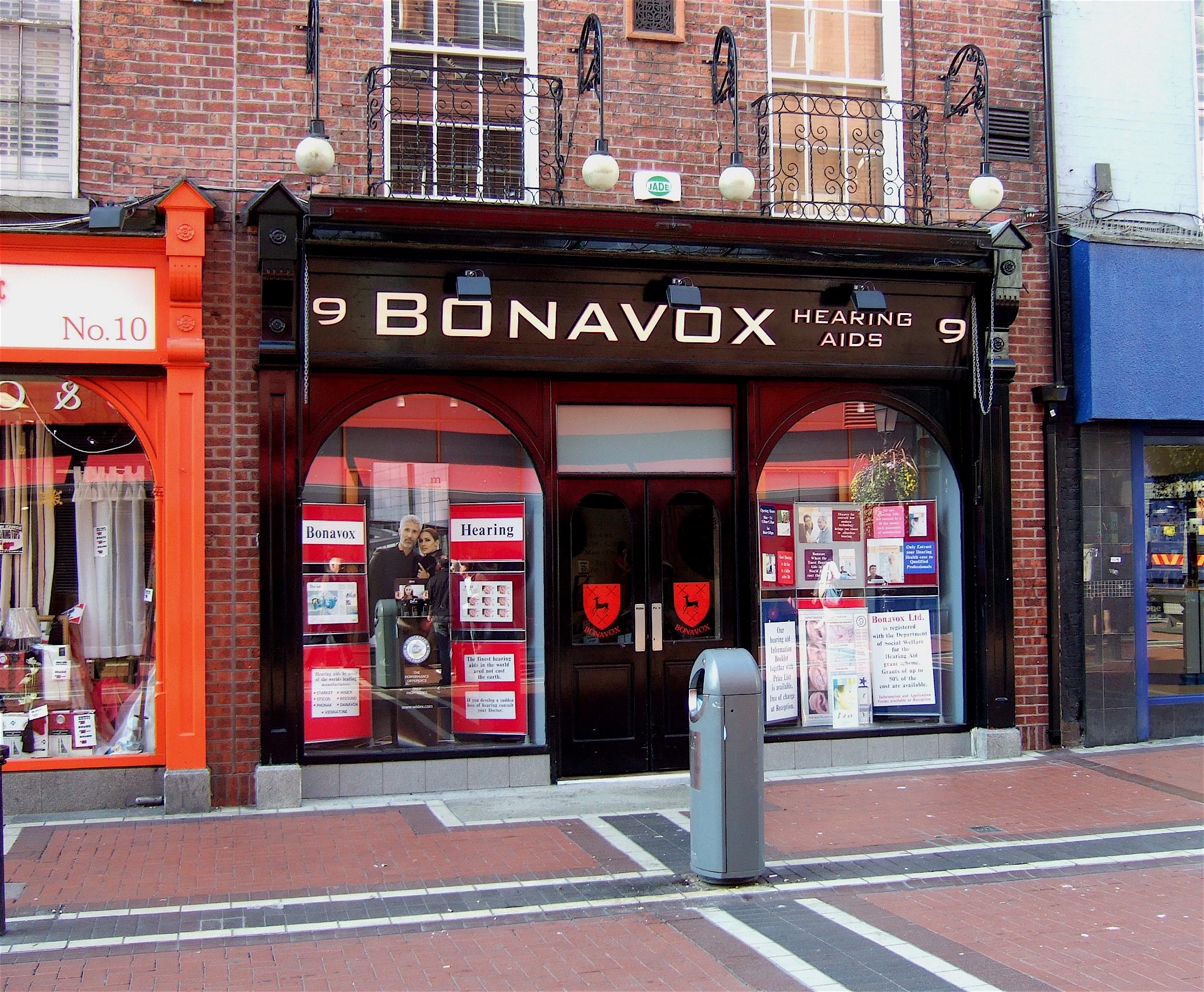
Hearing aid shop, Dublin, Ireland

Several industrialized countries supply free or heavily discounted hearing aids through their publicly funded health care system.

=== Australia ===
The Australian Department of Health and Ageing provides eligible Australian citizens and residents with a basic hearing aid free-of-charge, though recipients can pay a "top up" charge if they wish to upgrade to a hearing aid with more or better features. Maintenance of these hearing aids and a regular supply of batteries is also provided, on payment of a small annual maintenance fee.

=== Canada ===
In Canada, health care is a responsibility of the provinces. In the province of Ontario, the price of hearing aids is partially reimbursed through the Assistive Devices Program of the Ministry of Health and Long-Term care, up to $500 for each hearing aid. Like eye appointments, audiological appointments are no longer covered through the provincial public health plan. Audiometric testing can still easily be obtained, often free of charge, in private sector hearing aid clinics and some ear, nose and throat doctors offices. Hearing aids may be covered to some extent by private insurance.

Provincial hearing aid assistance and coverage can vary widely depending on the province and territory. Funding is often limited and individuals must largely pay out of pocket or rely on private insurance sources or in some cases through government programs such as Veterans Affairs Canada or Workplace Safety & Insurance Board. Hearing aids are generally not administered through the public health system but rather through private independently operated clinics, chain clinics owned by hearing aid manufacturers, or large retail stores such as Costco.

=== Iceland ===
Social Insurance pays a one time fee of ISK 30,000 for any kind of hearing aid. However, the rules are complicated and require that both ears have significant hearing loss in order to qualify for reimbursement. BTE hearing aids range from ISK 60,000 to ISK 300,000.

=== India ===
In India hearing aids of all kinds are easily available. Under central and state government health services, the poor can often avail themselves of free hearing devices. However, market prices vary for others and can range from Rs 10,000 to Rs 275,000 per ear.

=== New Zealand ===
In New Zealand, eligible residents may receive a government subsidy of NZ$1,022.22 toward hearing aids through the Ministry of Health's Hearing Aid Subsidy Scheme. Individuals with complex needs (e.g., children, those with dual sensory loss, or beneficiaries) may qualify for full funding under the Hearing Aid Funding Scheme.

Some providers have introduced alternative pricing models to improve affordability and access. For example, Resonate Health, a New Zealand-owned audiology company, offers a subscription-based service that includes the cost of hearing aids, ongoing care, and servicing. This approach aims to reduce the upfront financial barrier for patients.

=== United Kingdom ===
From 2000 to 2005 the Department of Health worked with Action on Hearing Loss (then called RNID) to improve the quality of NHS hearing aids so every NHS audiology department in England was fitting digital hearing aids by March 2005. By 2003 over 175,000 NHS digital hearing aids had been fitted to 125,000 people. Private companies were recruited to enhance the capacity, and two were appointed – David Ormerod Hearing Centres, partly owned by Alliance Boots and Ultravox Group, a subsidiary of Amplifon.

Within the UK, the NHS provides digital BTE hearing aids to NHS patients, on long-term loan, free of charge. Other than BAHAs (bone anchored hearing aid) or cochlear implants, where specifically required, BTEs are usually the only style available. Private purchases may be necessary if a user desires a different style. Batteries are free.

In 2014 the Clinical Commissioning Group in North Staffordshire considered proposals to end provision of free hearing aids for adults with mild to moderate age related hearing loss, which currently cost them £1.2m a year. Action on Hearing Loss mobilised a campaign against the proposal.

In June 2018 the National Institute for Health and Care Excellence produced new guidance saying that hearing aids should be offered at the first opportunity when hearing loss affects the individual's ability to hear and communicate, rather than waiting for arbitrary thresholds of hearing loss to be reached.

=== United States ===
Most private healthcare providers in the United States do not provide coverage for hearing aids, so all costs are usually borne by the recipient. The cost for a single hearing aid can vary between $500 and $6,000 or more, depending on the level of technology and whether the clinician bundles fitting fees into the cost of the hearing aid. Though if an adult has hearing loss which substantially limits major life activities, some state-run vocational rehabilitation programs can provide upwards of full financial assistance. Severe and profound hearing loss often falls within the "substantially limiting" category. Less expensive hearing aids can be found on the internet or mail order catalogs, but most in the under-$200 range tend to amplify the low frequencies of background noise, making it harder to hear the human voice.

The cost of hearing aids is a tax-deductible medical expense for those who itemize medical deductions.

Research involving more than 40,000 US households showed a correlation between the degree of hearing loss and the reduction of personal income. According to the same research, hearing aids were shown to mitigate the impact of income loss by 90%–100% for those with milder hearing losses and from 65%–77% for those with severe to moderate hearing loss.

== Batteries ==
While there are some instances that a hearing aid uses a rechargeable battery or a long-life disposable battery, the majority of modern hearing aids use one of five standard button cell zinc–air batteries. (Older hearing aids often used mercury battery cells, but these cells have become banned in most countries today.) Modern hearing aid button cell types are typically referred to by their common number name or the color of their packaging.

They are typically loaded into the hearing aid via a rotating battery door, with the flat side (case) as the positive terminal (cathode) and the rounded side as the negative terminal (anode).

These batteries all operate from 1.35 to 1.45 volts.

The type of battery a specific hearing aid utilizes depends on the physical size allowable and the desired lifetime of the battery, which is in turn determined by the power draw of the hearing aid device. Typical battery lifetimes run between 1 and 14 days (assuming 16-hour days).

Hearing Aid Battery Types
Type/ Color Code	Dimensions (Diameter×Height)	Common Uses	Standard Names	Misc Names
675	11.6 mm × 5.4 mm	High-Power BTEs, Cochlear implants	IEC: PR44, ANSI: 7003ZD	675, 675A, 675AE, 675AP, 675CA, 675CP, 675HP, 675HPX, 675 Implant Plus, 675P (HP), 675PA, 675SA, 675SP, A675, A675P, AC675, AC675E, AC675E/EZ, AC675EZ, AC-675E, AP675, B675PA, B6754, B900PA, C675, DA675, DA675H, DA675H/N, DA675N, DA675X, H675AE, L675ZA, ME9Z, P675, P675i+, PR44, PR44P, PR675, PR675H, PR675P, PR-675PA, PZ675, PZA675, R675ZA, S675A, V675, V675A, V675AT, VT675, XL675, Z675PX, ZA675, ZA675HP
13	7.9 mm × 5.4 mm	BTEs, ITEs	IEC: PR48, ANSI: 7000ZD	13, 13A, 13AE, 13AP, 13HP, 13HPX, 13P, 13PA, 13SA, 13ZA, A13, AC13, AC13E, AC13E/EZ, AC13EZ, AC-13E, AP13, B13BA, B0134, B26PA, CP48, DA13, DA13H, DA13H/N, DA13N, DA13X, E13E, L13ZA, ME8Z, P13, PR13, PR13H, PR-13PA, PZ13, PZA13, R13ZA, S13A, V13A, VT13, V13AT, W13ZA, XL13, ZA13
312	7.9 mm × 3.6 mm	miniBTEs, RICs, ITCs	IEC: PR41, ANSI: 7002ZD	312, 312A, 312AE, 312AP, 312HP, 312HPX, 312P, 312PA, 312SA, 312ZA, AC312, AC312E, AC312E/EZ, AC312EZ, AC-312E, AP312, B312BA, B3124, B347PA, CP41, DA312, DA312H, DA312H/N, DA312N, DA312X, E312E, H312AE, L312ZA, ME7Z, P312, PR312, PR312H, PR-312PA, PZ312, PZA312, R312ZA, S312A, V312A, V312AT, VT312, W312ZA, XL312, ZA312
10	5.8 mm × 3.6 mm	CICs, RICs	IEC: PR70, ANSI: 7005ZD	10, 10A, 10AE, 10AP, 10DS, 10HP, 10HPX, 10SA, 10UP, 20PA, 230, 230E, 230EZ, 230HPX, AC10, AC10EZ, AC10/230, AC10/230E, AC10/230EZ, AC230, AC230E, AC230E/EZ, AC230EZ, AC-230E, AP10, B0104, B20BA, B20PA, CP35, DA10, DA10H, DA10H/N, DA10N, DA230, DA230/10, L10ZA, ME10Z, P10, PR10, PR10H, PR230H, PR536, PR-10PA, PR-230PA, PZA230, R10ZA, S10A, V10, VT10, V10AT, V10HP, V230AT, W10ZA, XL10, ZA10
5	5.8 mm × 2.1 mm	CICs	IEC: PR63, ANSI: 7012ZD	5A, 5AE, 5HPX, 5SA, AC5, AC5E, AP5, B7PA, CP63, CP521, L5ZA, ME5Z, P5, PR5H, PR-5PA, PR521, R5ZA, S5A, V5AT, VT5, XL5, ZA5

== Research ==
Research is also pointing towards hearing aids and proper amplification as a treatment for tinnitus, a medical condition which manifests itself as a ringing or buzzing in the ears.
