= Assistive listening device =

Tool to mitigate hearing loss

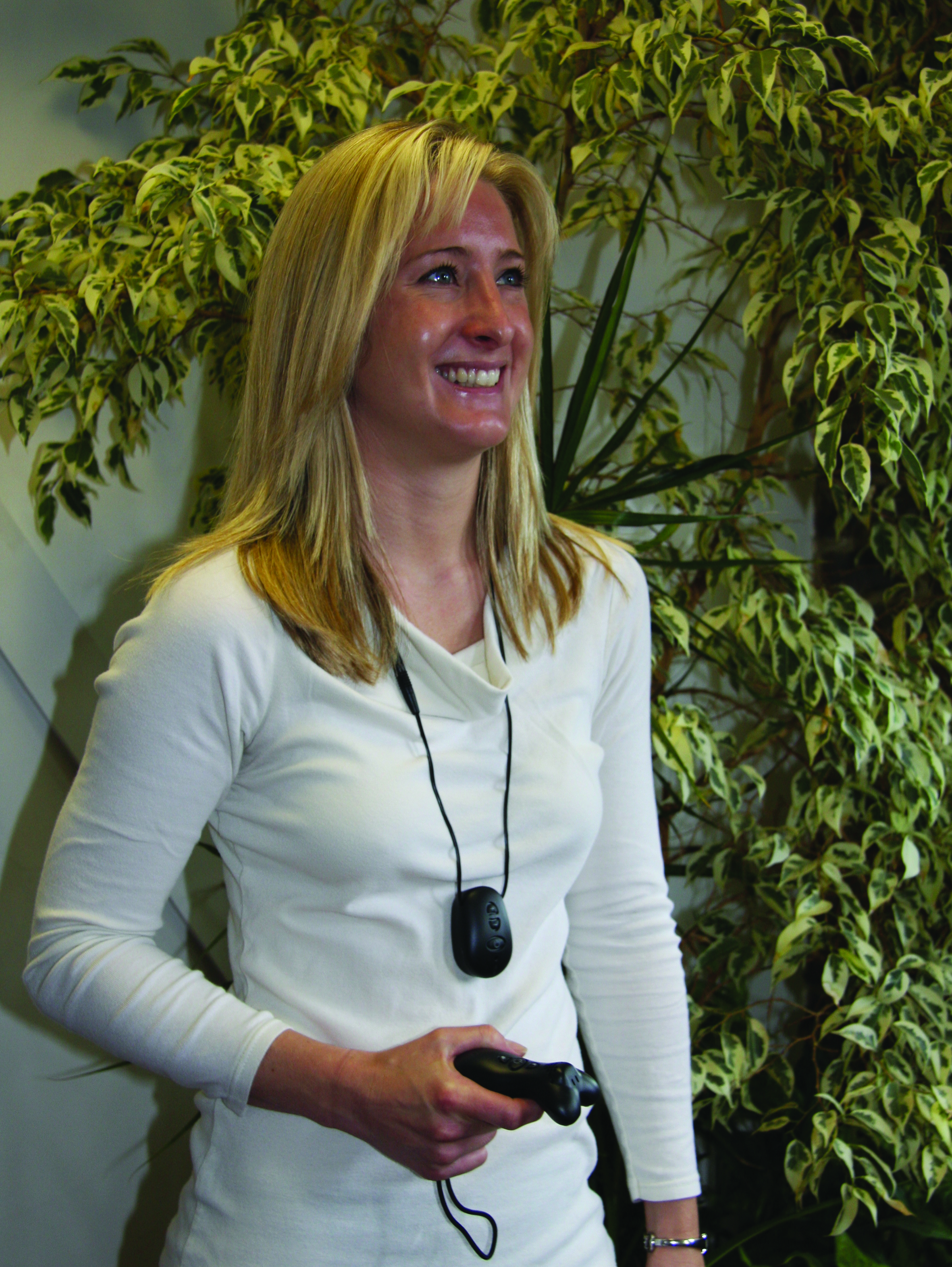
Using an assistive listening device to hear better in noisy environments

An assistive listening device (ALD) is part of a system used to improve hearing ability for people in a variety of situations where they are unable to distinguish speech in noisy environments. Often, in a noisy or crowded room it is almost impossible for an individual who is hard of hearing to distinguish one voice among many. This is often exacerbated by the effect of room acoustics on the quality of perceived speech. Hearing aids are able to amplify and process these sounds, and improve the speech to noise ratio. However, if the sound is too distorted by the time it reaches the listener, even the best hearing aids will struggle to unscramble the signal. Assistive listening devices offer a more adaptive alternative to hearing aids, but can be more complex and cumbersome.

== Usage ==
A common usage is to aid people who are hard of hearing (HOH) by amplification and providing a better signal to noise ratio (SNR). The ALD may be used to help HOH people hear televisions and other audio devices, or to help people hear speech through public address or sound reinforcement systems, such as in places of worship or lectures.

The use of a wireless microphone placed next to the person speaking eliminates the sounds between them and listener, which reduces the effects of reverberation from poor room acoustics, background noise around the listener, and background noise around the speaker (by using a directional microphone).

== Technology ==
The assistive listening device usually uses a microphone to capture an audio source near its origin and broadcast it Wirelessly through means of frequency modulation (FM), infrared (IR), an audio induction loop, or another method. The person who is listening may use a wireless Receiver to tune into the signal and listen at their preferred volume. There are also other consumer ALDs such as alarm clocks with bed shakers, amplified stethoscopes, baby monitors, and flashing door bell indicators. Most FM assistive listening devices operate on seventeen channels between 72.1000 and 75.800 MHz.

== See also ==
- Audio induction loop – Assistive listening technology (Telecoil)
- Auracast – Bluetooth broadcast audio technology
