= Pulse~Link =

Fabless integrated circuit semiconductor corporation

Pulse~LINK, Inc.
- Type: Privately held
- Industry: Semiconductor industry
- Founded: 2000
- Headquarters: Carlsbad, California, United States
- Key people: Greg Elmassian, COO/Chief Engineer; Scott Davis IT Director
- Products: PON devices
- Number of employees: ~8

Pulse~LINK is a privately held fabless integrated circuit semiconductor corporation headquartered in Carlsbad, California, located just north of San Diego California, in the United States. Pulse~LINK commercializes ultra-wideband (UWB) technology, for both wireless and wired networks.

== Company ==
Pulse~Link developed a UWB technology based on continuous pulsed UWB (C-UWB) for whole-home distribution of interactive high data rate multimedia content over wired, wireless and hybrid networks. One implementation of the technology is designed to coexist with existing CATV signals over existing coax to the home.

Pulse~LINK's CWave implementation of C-UWB provides raw data rates up to a 2.7 Gigabits per second over coaxial cable and wireless networks. It is promoted for its ability to co-exist with CATV signals, as an "overlay" to bring more data to consumer's homes. Pulse~LINK's CWave implementations of C-UWB can support the simultaneous operation of IEEE 1394, Gigabit Ethernet and HDMI-equivalent connections with end-to-end quality of service (QoS).

Pulse~LINK developed a set of integrated circuits for media access control (MAC) and radio frequency (RF) layers, and later brought a single integrated MCM module incorporating the baseband/mac/rf plus system ram.

After joining both the UWB Forum and WiMedia Alliance in 2004, in February 2005, it positioned its technology as a third alternative to the technologies promoted by the after groups. It had raised $38 million by then. Demonstrations were shown at the Consumer Electronics Show in 2008, including a television from Westinghouse Digital. By January 2009, more competing technologies such as WirelessHD were demonstrated at CES.

By March 2009, the company reduced its staff and was looking for new investors. After spending an estimated $100 million on research and development, in December 2012 a company reorganization was announced, with Brady Buckley appointed the new chief executive.

Later, controlling interest in the company was achieved by Antronix, formerly a customer of Pulse~LINK.
