= FM-UWB =

Type of frequency modulation

FM-UWB is a modulation scheme using double FM: low-modulation index digital FSK followed by high-modulation index analog FM to create a constant envelope UWB signal. FDMA techniques at the subcarrier level may be exploited to accommodate multiple users. The system is intended for low (10–50 kbit/s) and medium (50–250 kbit/s) bit rate, and short-range WPAN systems. The technology, developed at CSEM, is paving the way for true low-power LDR-UWB communication devices. FM-UWB is an optional mode in the IEEE 802.15.6 Body Area Network (BAN) standard.

== See also ==
- UWB Forum
- WiMedia Alliance
- Wireless
- Personal Area Network
