= IEEE 802.15 =

Set of IEEE standards for wireless personal area networks

IEEE 802.15 is a working group of the Institute of Electrical and Electronics Engineers (IEEE) IEEE 802 standards committee which specifies Wireless Specialty Networks (WSN) standards. The working group was formerly known as Working Group for Wireless Personal Area Networks.

The number of Task Groups in IEEE 802.15 varies based on the number of active projects. The current list of active projects can be found on the IEEE 802.15 website.

== IEEE 802.15.1: WPAN / Bluetooth ==
Task group one is based on Bluetooth technology. It defines physical layer (PHY) and medium access control (MAC) specification for wireless connectivity with fixed, portable and moving devices within or entering personal operating space. Standards were issued in 2002 and 2005.

== IEEE 802.15.2: Coexistence ==
Task group two addresses the coexistence of wireless personal area networks (WPAN) with other wireless devices operating in unlicensed frequency bands such as wireless local area networks (WLAN). The IEEE 802.15.2-2003 standard was published in 2003 and task group two went into "hibernation".

== IEEE 802.15.3: High Rate WPAN ==
=== IEEE 802.15.3-2003 ===
IEEE 802.15.3-2003 is a MAC and PHY standard for high-rate (11 to 55 Mbit/s) WPANs. The standard can be downloaded via the IEEE Get program, which is funded by IEEE 802 volunteers.

=== IEEE 802.15.3a ===
IEEE P802.15.3a was an attempt to provide a higher speed ultra-wideband PHY enhancement amendment to IEEE 802.15.3 for applications that involve imaging and multimedia. The members of the task group were not able to come to an agreement choosing between two technology proposals, Multi-band Orthogonal Frequency Division Multiplexing (MB-OFDM) and Direct Sequence UWB (DS-UWB), backed by two different industry alliances and was withdrawn in January 2006. Documents related to the development of IEEE 802.15.3a are archived on the IEEE document server.

=== IEEE 802.15.3b-2006 ===
IEEE 802.15.3b-2005 amendment was released on May 5, 2006. It enhanced 802.15.3 to improve implementation and interoperability of the MAC. This amendment includes many optimizations, corrected errors, clarified ambiguities, and added editorial clarifications while preserving backward compatibility. Among other changes, the amendment defined the following new features:

- a new MAC layer management entity (MLME) service access point (SAP)
- implied acknowledgment policy that allow polling
- logical link control/subnetwork access protocol (LLC/SNAP) headers
- multicast address assignment
- multiple contention periods in a superfame
- a method for relinquishing channel time to another device in the PAN
- faster network recover in the case when the piconet coordinator (PNC) abruptly disconnects
- a method for a device to return information about signal quality of a received packet.

=== IEEE 802.15.3c-2009 ===
IEEE 802.15.3c-2009 was published on September 11, 2009. The task group TG3c developed a millimeter-wave-based alternative physical layer (PHY) for the existing 802.15.3 Wireless Personal Area Network (WPAN) Standard 802.15.3-2003. The IEEE 802.15.3 Task Group 3c (TG3c) was formed in March 2005. This mmWave WPAN is defined to operate in the 57–66 GHz range. Depending on the geographical region, anywhere from 2 to 9 GHz of bandwidth is available (for example, 57–64 GHz is available as unlicensed band defined by FCC 47 CFR 15.255 in North America). The millimeter-wave WPAN allows very high data rate, short range (10 m) for applications including high-speed internet access, streaming content download (video on demand, HDTV, home theater, etc.), real-time streaming and wireless data bus for cable replacement. A total of three PHY modes were defined in the standard:

- Single carrier (SC) mode (up to 5.3 Gbit/s)
- High speed interface (HSI) mode (single carrier, up to 5 Gbit/s)
- Audio/visual (AV) mode (OFDM, up to 3.8 Gbit/s).

=== IEEE 802.15.3d-2017 ===
IEEE Std 802.15.3d-2017 defines an alternative physical layer (PHY) at the lower THz frequency range between 252 GHz and 325 GHz for switched point-to-point links is defined in this amendment. Two PHY modes are defined that enable data rates of up to 100 Gb/s using eight different bandwidths between 2.16 GHz and 69.12 GHz.

=== IEEE 802.15.3e-2017 ===
IEEE Std 802.15.3e-2017 provides an alternative physical layer (PHY) and a modified medium access control (MAC) layer is defined in this amendment. Two PHY modes have been defined that enable data rates up to 100 Gb/s using the 60 GHz band. MIMO and aggregation methods have been defined to increase the maximum achievable communication speeds. Stack acknowledgment has been defined to improve the medium access control (MAC) efficiency when used in a point-to-point (P2P) topology between two devices.

=== IEEE 802.15.3f-2017 ===
IEEE Std 802.15.3f-2017 extends the RF channelization of the millimeter wave PHYs to allow for use of the spectrum up to 71 GHz. 802.15.3f was initiated because several regulatory domains extended the licensed exempt 60 GHz bands up to 71 GHz.

== IEEE 802.15.4: Low Rate WPAN ==
Protocol stack for 802.15.4

IEEE 802.15.4-2003 (Low Rate WPAN) deals with low data rate but very long battery life (months or even years) and very low complexity. The standard defines both the physical (Layer 1) and data-link (Layer 2) layers of the OSI model. The first edition of the 802.15.4 standard was released in May 2003. Several standardized and proprietary networks (or mesh) layer protocols run over 802.15.4-based networks, including IEEE 802.15.5, Zigbee, Thread, 6LoWPAN, WirelessHART, and ISA100.11a.

=== WPAN Low Rate Alternative PHY (4a) ===
IEEE 802.15.4a (formally called IEEE 802.15.4a-2007) is an amendment to IEEE 802.15.4 specifying additional physical layers (PHYs) to the original standard. The principal interest was in providing higher precision ranging and localization capability (1 meter accuracy and better), higher aggregate throughput, adding scalability to data rates, longer range, and lower power consumption and cost. The selected baselines are two optional PHYs consisting of a UWB Pulse Radio (operating in unlicensed UWB spectrum) and a Chirp Spread Spectrum (operating in unlicensed 2.4 GHz spectrum). The Pulsed UWB Radio is based on Continuous Pulsed UWB technology (see C-UWB) and will be able to deliver communications and high precision ranging.

=== Revision and Enhancement (4b) ===
IEEE 802.15.4b was approved in June 2006 and was published in September 2006 as IEEE 802.15.4-2006. The IEEE 802.15 task group 4b was chartered to create a project for specific enhancements and clarifications to the IEEE 802.15.4-2003 standard, such as resolving ambiguities, reducing unnecessary complexity, increasing flexibility in security key usage, considerations for newly available frequency allocations, and others.

=== PHY Amendment for China (4c) ===
IEEE 802.15.4c was approved in 2008 and was published in January 2009. This defines a PHY amendment that adds new RF spectrum specifications to address the Chinese regulatory changes which have opened the 314-316 MHz, 430-434 MHz, and 779-787 MHz bands for Wireless PAN use within China.

=== PHY and MAC Amendment for Japan (4d) ===
The IEEE 802.15 Task Group 4d was chartered to define an amendment to the 802.15.4-2006 standard. The amendment defines a new PHY and such changes to the MAC as are necessary to support a new frequency allocation (950 MHz -956 MHz) in Japan while coexisting with passive tag systems in the band.

=== MAC Amendment for Industrial Applications (4e) ===
The IEEE 802.15 Task Group 4e is chartered to define a MAC amendment to the existing standard 802.15.4-2006. The intent of this amendment is to enhance and add functionality to the 802.15.4-2006 MAC to a) better support the industrial markets and b) permit compatibility with modifications being proposed within the Chinese WPAN. Specific enhancements were made to add channel hopping and a variable time slot option compatible with ISA100.11a. These changes were approved in 2011.

=== PHY and MAC Amendment for Active RFID (4f) ===
The IEEE 802.15.4f Active RFID System Task Group is chartered to define new wireless Physical (PHY) layer(s) and enhancements to the 802.15.4-2006 standard MAC layer which are required to support new PHY(s) for active RFID system bi-directional and location determination applications.

=== PHY Amendment for Smart Utility Networks (4g) ===
IEEE 802.15.4g Smart Utility Networks (SUN) Task Group is chartered to create a PHY amendment to 802.15.4 to provide a standard that facilitates very large-scale process control applications such as the utility smart grid network capable of supporting large, geographically diverse networks with minimal infrastructure, with potentially millions of fixed endpoints. In 2012 they released the 802.15.4g radio standard. The Telecommunications Industry Association TR-51 committee develops standards for similar applications.

=== Enhanced Ultra Wideband (UWB) Physical Layers (PHYs) and Associated Ranging Techniques (4z) ===
Approved in 2020, amendment to the UWB PHYs (e.g. with coding options) to increase accuracy and exchange ranging related information between the participating devices.

== IEEE 802.15.5: Mesh Networking ==
IEEE 802.15.5 provides the architectural framework enabling WPAN devices to promote interoperable, stable, and scalable wireless mesh networking. This standard is composed of two parts: low-rate WPAN mesh and high-rate WPAN mesh networks. The low-rate mesh is built on IEEE 802.15.4-2006 MAC, while the high rate mesh utilizes IEEE 802.15.3/3b MAC. The common features of both meshes include network initialization, addressing, and multi-hop unicasting. In addition, the low-rate mesh supports multicasting, reliable broadcasting, portability support, trace route and energy saving function, and the high-rate mesh supports multihop time-guaranteed service.

Mesh networking for IEEE 802.15.1 networks is beyond the scope of IEEE 802.15.5, and is instead carried out within the Bluetooth mesh working group.

== IEEE 802.15.6: Body Area Networks ==
In December 2011, the IEEE 802.15.6 task group approved a draft of a standard for Body Area Network (BAN) technologies. The draft was approved on 22 July 2011 by Letter Ballot to start the Sponsor Ballot process. Task Group 6 was formed in November 2007 to focus on a low-power and short-range wireless standard to be optimized for devices and operation on, in, or around the human body (but not limited to humans) to serve a variety of applications including medical, consumer electronics, and personal entertainment.

== IEEE 802.15.7: Visible Light Communication ==
The inaugural meeting for Task Group 7 was held during January 2009, where it was chartered to write standards for free-space optical communication using visible light. The 802.15.7-2011 Standard was published in September 2011. In 2015, a new task group was launched to revise the 802.15.7 standard, with several new PHY layers and MAC routines to support optical camera communications (OCC) and light fidelity (LiFi). As the new draft became too large, in March 2017, the 802.15 Working Group decided to continue 802.15.7 with OCC only, which is broadcast only, and to create a new task group 802.15.13 to work on a new standard for LiFi, which obviously needed a significantly revised MAC layer, besides new PHYs. The revision of 802.15.7-2018 was published in April 2019. In September 2020, a new PAR was approved, and a new task group started to work on a first amendment P802.15.7a aiming at increased data rate and longer range for OCC.

== IEEE P802.15.8: Peer Aware Communications ==
IEEE P802.15.8 received IEEE Standards Board approval on 29 March 2012 to form a Task Group to develop a standard for Peer Aware Communications (PAC) optimized for peer-to-peer and infrastructure-less communications with fully distributed coordination operating in bands below 11 GHz. The proposed standard is targeting data rates greater than 100 kbit/s with scalable data rates up to 10 Mbit/s. Features of the proposed include:

- discovery for peer information without association
- discovery of the number of devices in the network
- group communications with simultaneous membership in multiple groups (typically up to 10)
- relative positioning
- multi-hop relay
- security

The draft standard is under development, more information can be found on the IEEE 802.15 Task Group 8 web page.

== IEEE P802.15.9: Key Management Protocol ==
IEEE P802.15.9 received IEEE Standards Board approval on 7 December 2011 to form a Task Group to develop a recommended practice for the transport of Key Management Protocol (KMP) datagrams. The recommended practice will define a message framework based on Information Elements as a transport method for key management protocol (KMP) datagrams and guidelines for the use of some existing KMPs with IEEE Std 802.15.4. The recommended practice will not create a new KMP.

While IEEE Std 802.15.4 has always supported datagram security, it has not provided a mechanism for establishing the keys used by this feature. Lack of key management support in IEEE Std 802.15.4 can result in weak keys, which is a common avenue for attacking the security system. Adding KMP support is critical to a proper security framework. Some of the existing KMPs that it may address are IETF's PANA, HIP, IKEv2, IEEE Std 802.1X, and 4-Way-Handshake.

The draft recommended practice is under development, more information can be found on the IEEE 802.15 web page.

== IEEE P802.15.10: Layer 2 Routing ==
IEEE P802.15.10 received IEEE Standards Board approval on 23 August 2013 to form a Task Group to develop a recommended practice for routing packets in dynamically changing 802.15.4 wireless networks (changes on the order of a minute time frame), with minimal impact to route handling. The goal is to extend the coverage area as the number of nodes increase. The route related capabilities that the recommended practice will provide include the following:

- Route establishment
- Dynamic route reconfiguration
- Discovery and addition of new nodes
- Breaking of established routes
- Loss and recurrence of routes
- Real time gathering of link status
- Allowing for single hop appearance at the networking layer (not breaking standard L3 mechanisms)
- Support for broadcast
- Support for multicast
- Effective frame forwarding

The draft recommended practice is under development; more information can be found on the IEEE 802.15.10 web page.

== IEEE 802.15.13: Multi-Gigabit/s Optical Wireless Communications ==
The first meeting of Task Group 13 was held during March 2017, aiming at a new standard on light fidelity (LiFi), i.e. mobile communications by using the light. The aim is to address industrial applications, i.e. ultra-reliable, low-latency connectivity with negligible jitter for next-generation IoT. Compared to 802.15.7, the group decided to rewrite the standard entirely, based on existing and new contributions, to meet those targets. The group first worked on a low-power pulsed modulation PHY (PM-PHY) using On-Off-Keying (OOK) with frequency-domain equalization (FDE) and also a high-bandwidth PHY (HB-PHY) based on orthogonal frequency-division multiplexing (OFDM) adopted from ITU-T G.9991. The group also decided to implement mobility by considering access points in the infrastructure and mobile users in the service area as inputs and outputs of a distributed multiple-input multiple-output (D-MIMO) link. 802.15.13 supports D-MIMO natively with a minimalistic design, suitable for specialty applications. It is implementable on low-cost FPGAs and off-the-shelf computing hardware. The Working Group letter ballot and the IEEE SA Ballot were started in November 2019 and November 2020, respectively. Publication is expected mid of 2022.

== Wireless Next Generation Standing Committee ==
The IEEE P802.15 Wireless Next Generation Standing Committee (SCwng) is chartered to facilitate and stimulate presentations and discussions on new wireless related technologies that may be subject for new 802.15 standardization projects or to address the whole 802.15 work group with issues or concerns with techniques or technologies.

== See also ==
- IEEE 802.11 – Wireless network standard
- IEEE 802.15.4 – IEEE standard for low-rate wireless personal area networks
- IEEE 802.15.6 – IEEE standard
- IEEE 802.11bb – Wireless networking standard
- Bluetooth – Short-range wireless technology standard
- DASH7 – Open-source wireless sensor and actuator network protocol
- Energy harvesting – Collecting energy from external sources
- EnOcean – Energy harvesting wireless technology
- List of device bandwidths
- Sun SPOT – Wireless network sensor node
- Ultra wideband – Very low energy, short range radio precise positioning (UWB)
- UWB Forum
- Bluetooth low energy – Wireless personal area network technology
- WiMedia Alliance
- WirelessHD
- Wireless USB – Wireless radio communication protocol
- 6LoWPAN – IETF working group
