= LitePoint =

Tech company

- Type: Public
- Industry: Wireless Test
- Founded: April 28, 2000; 26 years ago
- Founders: Benny Madsen, Christian Olgaard and Spiros Bouas
- Headquarters: San Jose, California, United States
- Parent: Teradyne
- Website: https://www.litepoint.com/

LitePoint is a Wireless test company. The company’s hardware and software can be used to verify quality of wireless connectivity in smartphones, tablets, PCs, wireless access points and chipsets across WLAN and cellular technologies, including 5G, Bluetooth, Low Power Wide Area (LPWAN), NFC, Wi-Fi 6, Wi-Fi 6E, UWB, V2X and Zigbee. LitePoint claims it works with all of the leading chipset companies.

The company is headquartered in San Jose, California, with additional offices. LitePoint is a wholly owned subsidiary of Teradyne, a developer and supplier of automatic test equipment (ATE).

== History ==
LitePoint was founded in 2000 by Benny Madsen, Christian Olgaard and Spiros Bouas. In 2011, LitePoint was acquired by Teradyne. In 2014, the company claimed it had supporting test equipment for 300 cellular and wireless connectivity chipsets. In 2019, LitePoint moved their headquarters from Sunnyvale, California to San Jose.

== Work with FiRa Consortium ==
In 2019, LitePoint joined the FiRa Consortium, an organization aimed at facilitating the evolution of UWB wireless technology and fine-ranging (FiRa) technology. When the consortium formed, LitePoint was the only test vendor, joining other consortium members including Bosch, Samsung and Sony.

== Awards ==
In 2013, the company’s IQxel-160 connectivity test system won the EDN China Innovation Award as the product leader in communications testing in the test and measurement category.
