= Alereon =

American semiconductor company

- Type: Private
- Industry: Semiconductors
- Founded: 2003
- Headquarters: Austin, Texas, USA
- Key people: David Shoemaker (CEO)
- Website: www.alereon.com

Alereon, Inc, is a fabless semiconductor company. It uses ultrawideband (UWB) radio technology to develop Certified Wireless USB and WiMedia Alliance-compliant UWB integrated circuits (ICs). Headquartered in Austin, Texas, Alereon also has offices in Korea and Hong Kong.

== History ==
Alereon was spun off from Time Domain Corporation of Huntsville, Alabama, in August 2003 taking with it a number of engineers, executives, and patents from its parent company. An early investor was Austin Ventures. Eric Broockman was the first company CEO in 2003.

It initially backed the multi-band orthogonal frequency-division multiplexing approach taken by the MultiBand OFDM Alliance. A number of competing technologies were discussed by the IEEE 802.15 standards committee in 2004. In October 2005, $20 million in financing included investors Centennial Ventures and Pharos Capital. After the IEEE effort was abandoned, the venture arm of Samsung Electronics invested $4 million in December 2006. By 2009, Brookman was still chief executive and stepped down in 2014 to be replaced by David Shoemaker who was previously vice president of Engineering. In June 2012, an addition $6 million of funding was announced with investors Pharos Capital Partners and Duchossois Technology Partners and led by Enhanced Capital Partners.

== Operations and technology ==
Alereon applies its UWB's in the areas of consumer, military and medical. Their technology covers a larger spectrum than WiFi does and provides more bandwidth for video. In the consumer area, the company works together with monitor and consumer electronics manufacturers for their wireless PC/laptop/tablet docking stations, their wireless monitors, wireless PC-to-HDTV video streaming devices, as well as wireless cable replacements for HDMI, DVI, VGA, USB, audio, and Ethernet. Alereon provides chipsets, modules and software development kits (SDK) and tools. All of the UWB chipsets from Alereon consist of two chips, the AL5350B MAC/Baseband and the AL5100 RF Transceiver.
