= UWB ranging =

Wireless positioning technology

Ultra-wideband impulse radio ranging (or UWB-IR ranging) is a Wireless positioning technology based on IEEE 802.15.4z standard, which is a wireless communication protocol introduced by IEEE, for systems operating in unlicensed spectrum, equipped with extremely large bandwidth transceivers. UWB enables very accurate ranging (in the order of centimeters) without introducing significant interference with narrowband systems. To achieve these stringent requirements, UWB-IR systems exploit the available bandwidth (which exceeds 500 MHz for systems compliant to IEEE 802.15.4z protocol) that they support, which guarantees very accurate timing (and thus ranging) and robustness against multipath, especially in indoor environments. The available bandwidth also enables UWB systems to spread the signal power over a large spectrum (this technology is thus called spread spectrum), avoiding narrowband interference.

== Protocol ==
UWB-IR relies on the low-power transmission of specific sequences of short-duration pulses. The transmit power is limited according to FCC regulations, in order to reduce interference and power consumption. The bands supported by the standard are the following ones:

- The sub-gigahertz band, which contains only 1 channel and ranges from 249.6 MHz to 749.6 MHz.
- The low band, which contains 4 channels and ranges from 3.1 GHz to 4.8 GHz.
- The high band, which contains 11 channels and ranges from 6.0 GHz to 10.6 GHz.

The primary time division in UWB systems is structured in frames. Each frame is composed by the concatenation of 2 sequences:

- The first one is called preamble (also known as SHR or synchronization header) and consists of a header, known a priori both at transmitter and receiver side. It is employed for synchronization purposes.
- The second one is called physical layer protocol data unit (abbreviated to PPDU) and contains the data to communicate, which are known a priori only at transmitter side.

The further time subdivisions of the preamble and the PPDU are organized in different ways. For localization purposes, only the preamble is employed (and described in detail later on), since it is specifically designed to perform accurate synchronization at receiver side.

The SHR sequence is composed by the concatenation of 2 other subsequences:

- The first one is called synchronization sequence (abbreviated to SYNC) and it is the longest one. Its purpose is to increase the effective SNR and simultaneously exhibit a highly peaked autocorrelation function, in order to enhance synchronization accuracy.
- The second one is called start of frame delimiter sequence (abbreviated to SFD) and, as the name suggests, it is employed to efficiently recognize the time delimitations of the various frames.
- Both the SYNC and the SFD sequences are furtherly time-divided into symbols.
- The SYNC sequence consists of $N_{\mathrm{sync}} \in \{16,64,1024,4096\}$ identical symbols.
- The SFD sequence consists of $N_{\mathrm{sfd}} \in \{8,64\}$ different symbols, generated according to a specific code which enables to easily detect the time delimitations of the frame.
- Each symbol consists of a sequence of bursts, generated through a ternary code (the elements of the sequence can be 0, +1, -1) of length 31 or 127. These codes are specifically designed to have highly peaked autocorrelation and very-low cross-correlation, in order to simplify synchronization through peak-finding and simultaneously avoiding false alarms (i.e. detection of a code which was not transmitted).
- Each burst is furtherly divided in $L$ chips.
- $L$ is called spreading factor and it is defined as the ratio between the PRF and the chip rate. $L$ can be equal to 16 or 64 for length-31 codes while it is set to 4 for length-127 codes; thus the number of chips per symbol $N_{\mathrm{cps}} \in \{ 496,508,1984 \}$. The purpose of the spreading factor, as the name suggests, is to spread the signal in time domain, in order to make the chips very sparse in time, allowing to reduce interference with other systems operating in the same band.
- The chip rate is $f_c$ = 500 MHz or, alternatively, the chip time is $T_c$ = 2 ns.
- Each chip is modulated by the same pulse waveform.
- The pulse waveform is not specified by the protocol, thus it is left to user preference. However the spectrum of the pulses must be entirely contained in the allowed channels.

== SHR waveform ==
The transmitted SHR waveform (baseband equivalent) can be modeled as follows

$$x(t) = \sum_{k,n} c_{kn} \cdot  p \big( t - n L T_c - k N_{\mathrm{cps}} T_c \big)$$

where the parameters are defined as shown here below

- $c_{kn} \in \{ 0, \pm1 \}$.
- $p (t)$ is the pulse shape.
- $L$ is the spreading factor.
- $N_{\mathrm{cps}}$ is the number of chips per symbol.
- $T_c$ is the chip time.

The received SHR waveform can instead be described as

$$y(t) = \sum_{k,n,\ell} \alpha_\ell \cdot c_{kn} \cdot  p \big( t - n L T_c - k N_{\mathrm{cps}} T_c -\tau_\ell \big) + w(t)$$

where the additional parameters are defined as follows

- $\alpha_\ell$ and $\tau_\ell$ are the complex channel gain and the propagation delay associated to the $\ell^{th}$ path.
- $w(t)$ is the noise waveform, which is usually described as AWGN.

In order to associate the propagation delay to a distance, there must exist a LoS path between transmitter and receiver or, alternatively, a detailed map of the environment has to be known in order to perform localization based on the reflected rays.

In presence of multipath, the large bandwidth is of paramount importance to distinguish all the replicas, which otherwise would significantly overlap at receiver side, especially in indoor environments.

== Ranging ==
The propagation delay can be estimated through several algorithms, usually based on finding the peak of the cross-correlation between the received signal and the transmitted SHR waveform. Commonly used algorithms are maximum correlation and maximum likelihood.

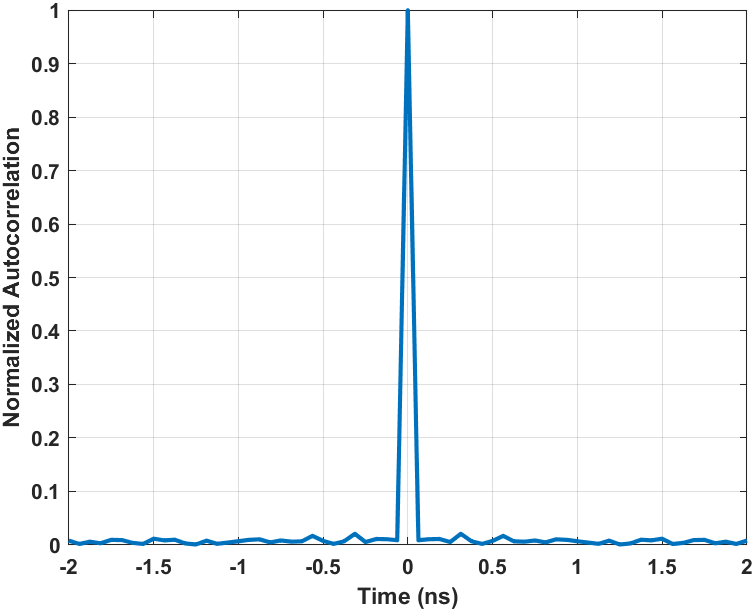
Typical autocorrelation function of SHR waveform. The peak correspond to the estimated delay, which in this case is 0

There are two methods to estimate the mutual distance between the transceivers. The first one is based on the time of arrival (TOA) and it is called one-way ranging. It requires a priori synchronization between the anchors and it consists in estimating the delay and computing the range as

$$\hat{r} = c\cdot \hat{\tau}$$
where $\hat{\tau}$ refers to the LoS path estimated delay.

The second method is based on the round-trip time (RTT) and it is called two-way ranging. It consists in the following procedure:

- The first anchor transmits a data frame
- The second anchor receives the frame and waits for a fixed amount of time $T$
- After waiting for a time $T$, the second anchor transmits the acknowledgment frame
- The first anchor receives the acknowledgment frame and estimates the delay accumulated since the transmission of the initial data frame

In this second case the distance between the 2 anchors can be computed as

$$\hat{r} = \frac{1}{2} \cdot c \cdot ( \hat{\tau} - T)$$
Also in this case $\hat{\tau}$ refers to the LoS path estimated delay.

== Pros and cons ==
Performing ranging through UWB presents several advantages:

- The transmit power is very low (0.1 mW), allowing to save battery and limiting interference with other communication systems.
- Due to low transmit power, high spreading factor and employment of effective ternary ranging codes, interference is very limited.
- Limited interference enables many different systems (such as Wi-Fi, Bluetooth, cordless phones, etc...) to operate in the same band without impair (or introducing very low impairments) each other.
- UWB operates in unlicensed spectrum, therefore no license is required, making these systems relatively cheap.
- High sparsity in time domain and usage of ternary ranging codes, allow high frequency reuse, since the band is much larger than the typical required bit rate.
- Since the bandwidth is large, high data rate transmissions are supported, in case low-latency data communication is necessary to perform the localization (e.g. communicating anchor reference position, velocity and timing).
- Precise temporal (and thus range) resolution can be achieved through large bandwidth, which also allows to accurately discriminate the multipath replicas at receiver side.
- The method based on RTT does not require a priori synchronization.

However, there are also some disadvantages related to UWB systems:

- Due to low transmit power limits, UWB systems can operate only at short range otherwise the signal is undetectable at receiver side.
- Due to large bandwidth, the noise power level is typically high, degrading the SNR and thus the ranging accuracy.
- Large bandwidth requires high sampling frequencies, which can make the transceivers pretty expensive.

== See also ==
- IEEE 802.15.4
- List of UWB channels
- Spread spectrum
- Indoor positioning system
- Time of arrival
- Round-trip delay
