= IEEE 802.15.4a =

Personal area network IEEE standard

IEEE 802.15.4a (formally called IEEE 802.15.4a-2007) was an amendment to IEEE 802.15.4-2006 specifying that additional physical layers (PHYs) be added to the original standard. It has been merged into and is superseded by IEEE 802.15.4-2011.

== Overview ==
IEEE 802.15.4-2006 specified four different PHYs, three of which utilized direct-sequence spread spectrum (DSSS), and one which used parallel-sequence spread spectrum (PSSS). IEEE 802.15.4a specifies two additional PHYs using ultra-wideband (UWB) and chirp spread spectrum (CSS). The UWB PHY is designated frequencies in three ranges: below 1 GHz, between 3 and 5 GHz, and between 6 and 10 GHz. The CSS PHY is designated to the 2450 MHz ISM band.

== History ==
The IEEE 802.15 Low Rate Alternative PHY Task Group (TG4a) for Wireless personal area networks (WPANs), as its name implies, was tasked with amending the 802.15 standard to provide alternate PHY standards that would allow for high aggregate throughput (much throughput over time) communications with a precision ranging capability (within 1 meter accuracy) and low power usage within the scope of the WPAN. TG4a was one of two groups tasked to standardize UWB - the other being TG3a. However, TG3a fell apart because of a deadlock between proponents of two competing UWB technologies: Direct Sequence UWB and Multi-Band Orthogonal Frequency Division Multiplexing (OFDM) UWB. Direct Sequence UWB, which was promoted by the Zigbee Alliance, found its home with TG4a, while Multi-Band OFDM UWB was adopted by the WiMedia Alliance which published ECMA-368 (ECMA is another telecommunications standardization body that is similar to the IEEE).

As was mentioned above, the Direct Sequence UWB PHY was the one that ended up being added into the IEEE 802.15.4a standard. Direct Sequence UWB is spectrally efficient, can support precision ranging, and is very robust even at low transmit powers. The Chirp Spread Spectrum PHY was added to the standard because CSS supports communications to devices moving at high speeds and at longer ranges than any of the other PHYs in the IEEE 802.15.4 standard. Basically, both new PHYs added scalability to data rates, longer ranges, and lower power consumption into the standard - thus meeting the intent of the IEEE 802.15 standard to emphasize very low cost communications.

An updated version was in preparation by Task Group 4h . It should correct the errors in the IEEE Standard 802.15.4a-2007 document.

The standard has been consolidated into and superseded by IEEE Standard 802.15.4-2011.

== Uses ==
nanotron Technologies developed their first Chirp Spread Spectrum (CSS) smart RF module Smart nanoLOC RF with ranging capabilities certified in Europe and Japan in February 2008.

IMEC made the first UWB transmitter that is compliant to the new standard which they plan to use in wireless autonomous transducer systems used in healthcare, lifestyle and process automation applications. In addition, DecaWave have announced that its 802.15.4a compliant UWB ScenSor chip will be sampled to customers early in 2010.

== See also ==
- DASH7
- Ultra-wideband
- Zigbee
