= List of UWB channels =

This List of Ultra-wideband (UWB) Channels describes the physical bands and TFC codes defined in the WiMedia Alliance PHY specification, as well as their link to the logical channels used in the higher layers such as the Wireless USB driver.

== Spectrum Definition ==
Many countries have allocated spectrum for UWB use, with various restrictions and power output limits. The standardized output level for UWB communications is –41.3dBm/MHz. The WiMedia Alliance has defined fourteen 500-MHz bands to divide up the 3.1-10.6 GHz spectrum allocated for Ultra-Wideband communications in the U.S. in 2002.

Many countries had already allocated some spectrum <6 GHz for other uses such as GPS and satellite communications and therefore desired a way to protect those existing devices and applications while allocating additional spectrum for UWB communications, with the idea that UWB devices would avoid the traditional transmitters when they came into geographical proximity or radio range. DAA stands for “Detect and Avoid” and is a similar technique to cognitive radio that was defined for this legacy coexistence. Cognitive radio attempts to detect “primary users” and switch communications to another unused channel. Cognitive Radio is often in the news for trying to make use of the “White Space” between legacy TV broadcast channels. DAA is different in that UWB communications continue on the same band, but actually notch out the transmit spectrum around the legacy channel, so that they don't interfere but can make use of the channel. The requirement of DAA was placed on the Band Group 1 spectrum by the E.U. and others in 2006 with an implementation deadline of Dec 31, 2010. Due to the U.S. recession and financial difficulties for the UWB developing companies, there was less pressure on the E.U. to exactly define how silicon should implement DAA and companies have not fully implemented DAA. Therefore, devices with global regulatory certification usually use BG3 and BG6 since those bands do not have a DAA requirement. However, China did formally extend their DAA enforcement deadline to Dec 31st, 2013 for Bands 1, 2, and 3 and South Korea formally extended their DAA enforcement deadline to Dec 31st, 2016 for Band 3.

== Logical Channel Organization ==
Burst errors can occur in a single frequency due to RF noise. Therefore, interleaving symbols over three different UWB bands should minimize the total burst length in the message, improving the likelihood of error correction, thus improving the immunity of the signal. There is a slight time penalty for each frequency change because the PLL clocks have to settle at the new frequency.

Therefore, the WiMedia PHY Spec organizes the UWB Bands into Band Groups where a single logical channel can be defined that uses all three bands in the band group. Time Frequency Interleaving (TFI) channels spread their data across three frequency bands, while Fixed Frequency Interleaving (FFI) channels stay on a single frequency band during all time slots.

The two tables below are pulled directly from the WiMedia PHY Specification, v1.5. The Time Frequency Codes (TFC) define the frequency interleaving sequence for utilizing 1-3 of the bands within a band group. TFCs 1-4 are for TFI channels, TFCs 5-7 are for FFI channels, and TFCs 8-10 are for TFI2 channels, which simply interleave their data across two bands. Note that all TFCs will be in the same band at some time during their sequence.

TFC numbering of 1-10 repeats for each band group and these TFC numbers are primarily used by the MAC and PHY layers. However, a different numbering system is needed by higher layers to command the radio to switch to a unique logical channel across all of the UWB bands and band groups. This logical channel number is used by the application layers, such as the Wireless USB interface. As you can see from the table below, the FFI channels for BG1 and BG3 are 13-15 and 29-31, while the TFI channels for BG1 and BG3 are 9-12 and 25-28.

As an example, Japan allows usage of 7392-7920 MHz, which is Band9, the highest frequency band in Band Group 3. This corresponds to Channel 31, also known as BG3 TFC 7.

== UWB Measurements and Calculations ==
In order to properly measure a UWB signal with a spectrum analyzer and compare it to the -41.3dBm/MHz, you should use the following settings. If you connect a UWB transmitter directly into a spectrum analyzer (conducted with a cable, no antenna over the air), you should get values in the -43dBm to -40dBm range.

- Detector: RMS (NOT Peak. Use Average if RMS is not available)
- Sweep: 1ms/point. (In the image, 601points on the screen, 601ms sweep, so 1ms/pt. This averages/integrates the power received over 1ms)
- RBW: 1 MHz
- VBW: 3 MHz

This SpecAn screenshot shows BG1 TFC5, channel 9. Note the three bands, with gaps in between.

If you are doing tests in an Anechoic or Semi-Anechoic chamber, you have to account for the conversion between dBm power in a 50ohm cable to dBuV/m electric field over the air, as well as the antenna and preamp gains and the long cable loss between the receiving chamber antenna and the spectrum analyzer. For an example calculation, see pages 13–15 of the TDK Test Report for FCC ID: YYJ-5390144, the "WUSB Host Radio Board".

== Practical Considerations ==
Within a single band group, the maximum number of non-overlapping channels is actually three. Any time two devices are transmitting at the same frequency and within radio range (<10m), regardless of their logical channel they will either look like noise to each other or must logically share the timeslots in the channel. Three FFI channels will each use an individual band and will never overlap. In the TFI interleaving channel sequences, the channels will periodically hop into the same frequency and overlap.

== See also ==
- Ultra-wideband
- Wireless USB
- WiMedia Alliance
- List of WLAN channels
