= WiQuest Communications =

Defunct American WiFi device manufacturer

WiQuest Communications, Inc.
- Company type: Private
- Industry: Semiconductors
- Founded: 2003 in Allen, Texas
- Defunct: October 31, 2008
- Fate: Bankruptcy (India operations acquired by Staccato Communications)
- Headquarters: Allen, Texas, United States
- Number of employees: 120 (2008)
- Website: www.wiquest.com

WiQuest Communications, was an American fabless semiconductor company that designed and developed Wireless USB (WUSB) products using WiMedia Alliance technology for high-speed, short-range applications. WiQuest offered integrated circuits, software, and reference designs. WiQuest was headquartered in Allen, Texas, and had operations in Bangalore, India. It operated from 2003 until it went bankrupt in 2008.

== History ==
The company was founded in 2003.

By early 2008, WiQuest's Wireless USB products had an 85% market share. Among WiQuest's customers were laptop manufacturers Toshiba, Dell and Lenovo, and peripheral manufacturers D-Link, Belkin, Imation, and Kensington.

=== Demise ===
The company ceased operations on October 31, 2008. Reasons cited for the demise of WiQuest are the same issues that are plaguing Wireless USB technology in general, such as economic conditions in the late 2000s recession, the relative high cost of the end products, lackluster power-consumption and throughput characteristics of first-generation wireless USB products, regulatory issues, and low adapter attach rates.

The Bangalore operations were acquired by Staccato Communications.
