= Ambient network =

Ambient networks is a network integration design that seeks to solve problems relating to switching between networks to maintain contact with the outside world. This project aims to develop a network software-driven infrastructure that will run on top of all current or future network physical infrastructures to provide a way for devices to connect to each other, and through each other to the outside world.

The concept of Ambient Networks comes from the IST Ambient Network project, which was a research project sponsored by the European Commission within the Sixth Framework Programme (FP6).

== The Ambient Networks Project ==
Ambient Networks was a collaborative project within the European Union's Sixth Framework Programme that investigates future communications systems beyond fixed and 3rd generation mobile networks. It is part of the Wireless World Initiative. The project worked at a new concept called Ambient Networking, to provide suitable mobile networking technology for the future mobile and wireless communications environment. Ambient Networks aimed to provide a unified networking concept that can adapt to the very heterogeneous environment of different radio technologies and service and network environments. Special focus was put on facilitating both competition and cooperation of various market players by defining interfaces, which allow the instant negotiation of agreements. This approach went beyond interworking of well-defined protocols and was expected to have a long-term effect on the business landscape in the wireless world. Central to the project was the concept of composition of networks, an approach to address the dynamic nature of the target environment, based on an open framework for network control functionality, which can be extended with new capabilities as well as operating over existing connectivity infrastructure.

- Phase 1 of the project (2004–2005) laid the conceptual foundations. The Deliverable D1-5 "Ambient Networks Framework Architecture" summarizes the work from phase 1 and provides links to other relevant material.
- Phase 2 (2006–2007) focused on validation aspects. One key result of phase 2 is an integrated prototype that was used to study the feasibility of the Ambient Networks concept for a number of typical network scenarios. The ACS prototype was used to iteratively test the components developed by the project in a real implementation. In parallel, the top-down work was continued which led to a refined System Specification. This document, referred to as the System Description, is available on the Ambient Networks website. Furthermore, standardization of the composition concept is addressed in 3GPP.

== Interfaces and their use ==
The ACS (Ambient Control Space) is the internal of an ambient network. It has the functions that can be accessed and it is in full control of the resources of the network. The Ambient Networks infrastructure does not deal with nodes, instead it deals with networks, though at the beginning, all the "networks" might only consist of just one node: these "networks" need to merge to form a network in the original sense of the word. A composition establishment consists of the negotiation and then the realization of a Composition Agreement. This merging can happen be fully automatic. The decision to merge or not is decided using pre-configured policies.

There are three interfaces present to communicate with an ACS. These are:

- ANI: Ambient Network Interface. If a network wants to join in, it has to do so through this interface.
- ASI: Ambient Service Interface. If a function needs to be accessed inside the ACS, this Interface is used.
- ARI: Ambient Resource Interface. If a resource inside a network needs to be accessed (e.g. the volume of the traffic), this interface is used.

Interfaces are used to hide the internal structures of the underlying network.

If two networks meet, and decide to merge, a new ACS will be formed of the two (though the two networks will have their own ACS along with the interfaces inside this global, new ACS). The newly composed ACS will of course have its own ANI, ASI and ARI, and will use these interfaces to merge with other Ambient Networks. Other options for composition are to not merge the two Ambient Networks (Network Interworking) or to establish a new virtual ACS that exercises joint control over a given set of shared resources (Control Sharing).

== ACS Functional Entities ==
Functions are divided into Functional Entities (FEs). The ACS provides a flexible and extensible framework to run these FEs as a distributed system. Examples are

- Composition Functional Entity: Controlling composition of ANs
- Bearer Management FEs
- Overlay Management FEs

More information on FEs is contained in the Ambient Networks Framework Architecture and the latest version of the System Description.

== Example situation ==
Alice has a PAN, a Personal Area Network on her body: she has a Bluetooth enabled PDA, mobile phone and laptop that she is carrying, and are all currently turned on, and forming a network. Her laptop also has the ability to connect using an available WLAN, and her mobile phone has the ability to connect through GPRS, though GPRS is slower and much more costly for Alice to use. She is now on the move, and her laptop is downloading her emails using the GPRS connection on the mobile:

Laptop → (Bluetooth) → Mobile → (GPRS) → Mobile phone network

While walking, she passes into an area covered by a free WLAN hotspot: Her PAN now immediately starts to initiate a connection with the hotspot. This is called "merging" of the networks (that of the hotspot and that of her PAN). Once this merging is complete, the downloading of her email continues totally unaffected, but instead of using the expensive and slow GPRS connection, it is now using the newly established WLAN connection. If she now wants to browse the web with her PDA, the PDA will also use the WLAN connection of the laptop:

PDA → (bluetooth) → Laptop → (WLAN) → Hotspot
