= Detect and avoid =

Technical mitigation for ultra-wideband

Detect and avoid (DAA) is a set of technologies designed to avoid interference between a given emitter and the wireless environment. Its need was generated by the Ultra-wideband (UWB) standard that uses a fairly large spectrum to emit its pulses.

According to the U.S. Federal Communications Commission (FCC), UWB can use from 3.1 to 10.6 GHz. That means it could interfere with WiMAX, 3G or 4G networks.
