= IEEE 802.15.6 =

IEEE standard

The IEEE 802.15.6 standard is the latest international standard for Wireless Body Area Network (WBAN).

WBAN supports a variety of real-time health monitoring and consumer electronics applications. The latest international standard for WBAN is the IEEE 802.15.6 standard which aims to provide an international standard for low power, short range, and extremely reliable wireless communication within the surrounding area of the human body, supporting a vast range of data rates for different applications. Short-range, wireless communications in the vicinity of, or inside, a human body (but not limited to humans) are specified in this standard. It uses existing industrial scientific medical (ISM) bands as well as frequency bands approved by national medical and/or regulatory authorities. Support for quality of service (QoS), extremely low power, and data rates up to 10 Mbps is required while simultaneously complying with strict non-interference guidelines where needed.

== Security ==
This standard aims to provide the confidentiality, authentication, integrity, privacy protection, and replay defense. All nodes and hubs must choose three security levels: unsecured communication (level 0), authentication but no encryption (level 1), and authentication and encryption (level 2). During the security association process, a node and a hub need to jointly select a suitable security level. In unicast communication, a pre-shared or a new MK is activated. A Pairwise Temporal Key (PTK) is then generated that is used only once per session. In multicast communication, a Group Temporal Key (GTK) is generated that is shared with the corresponding group. All nodes and hubs in a WBAN have to go through certain stages at the MAC layer before data exchange. A security association is a procedure to identify a node and a hub to each other, to establish a new Master Key (MK) shared between them, or to activate an existing MK pre-shared between them. The security association in the IEEE 802.15.6 standard is based on four key agreement protocols that have security problems. There are some interesting proposals in the published academic literature which resolve the security and privacy problems of the current security association procedures of IEEE 802.15.6 in a suitable manner, however, the fact that such proposals have yet not being included with in the standard by IEEE is incomprehensible.

== See also ==
- Body Area Network
- IEEE 802.15
