= Body area network =

Computer network connecting devices around a human body

A body area network (BAN), also referred to as a wireless body area network (WBAN), a body sensor network (BSN) or a medical body area network (MBAN), is a wireless network of wearable computing devices. BAN devices may be embedded inside the body as implants or pills, may be surface-mounted on the body in a fixed position, or may be accompanied devices which humans can carry in different positions, such as in clothes pockets, by hand, or in various bags.

Devices are becoming smaller, especially in body area networks. These networks include multiple small body sensor units (BSUs) and a single central unit (BCU). Despite this trend, decimeter (tab and pad) sized smart devices still play an important role. They act as data hubs or gateways and provide a user interface for viewing and managing BAN applications on the spot.

The development of WBAN technology started around 1995 around the idea of using wireless personal area network (WPAN) technologies to implement communications on, near, and around the human body. About six years later, the term "BAN" came to refer to systems where communication is entirely within, on, and in the immediate proximity of a human body. A WBAN system can use WPAN wireless technologies as gateways to reach longer ranges. Through gateway devices, it is possible to connect the wearable devices on the human body to the internet. This way, medical professionals can access patient data online using the internet independent of the patient location.

== Concept ==
The rapid growth in physiological sensors, low-power integrated circuits, and wireless communication has enabled a new generation of wireless sensor networks, now used for purposes such as monitoring traffic, crops, infrastructure, and health. The body area network field is an interdisciplinary area which could allow inexpensive and continuous health monitoring with real-time updates of medical records through the Internet. A number of intelligent physiological sensors can be integrated into a wearable wireless body area network, which can be used for computer-assisted rehabilitation or early detection of medical conditions. This area relies on the feasibility of implanting very small biosensors inside the human body that are comfortable and that don't impair normal activities. The implanted sensors in the human body will collect various physiological changes in order to monitor the patient's health status no matter their location. The information will be transmitted wirelessly to an external processing unit. This device will instantly transmit all information in real time to the doctors throughout the world. If an emergency is detected, the physicians will immediately inform the patient through the computer system by sending appropriate messages or alarms. Currently, the level of information provided and energy resources capable of powering the sensors are limiting. While the technology is still in its primitive stage it is being widely researched and once adopted, is expected to be a breakthrough invention in healthcare, leading to concepts like telemedicine and MHealth becoming real.

== Applications ==
Initial applications of BANs are expected to appear primarily in the healthcare domain, especially for continuous monitoring and logging vital parameters of patients with chronic diseases such as diabetes, asthma and heart attacks.

- A BAN in place on a patient can alert the hospital, even before they have a heart attack, through measuring changes in their vital signs.
- A BAN on a patient with diabetes could auto inject insulin through a pump, as soon as their blood-sugar levels increase.
- A BAN can be used, to learn the underlying health state transitions and dynamics of a disease

Other applications of this technology include sports, military, or security. Extending the technology to new areas could also assist communication by seamless exchanges of information between individuals, or between individuals and machines.

== Standards ==
The latest international standard for BANs is the IEEE 802.15.6 standard.

== Components ==
A typical BAN or BSN requires vital sign monitoring sensors, motion detectors (through accelerometers) to help identify the location of the monitored individual and some form of communication, to transmit vital sign and motion readings to medical practitioners or care givers. A typical body area network kit will consist of sensors, a Processor, a transceiver and a battery. Physiological sensors, such as ECG and SpO2 sensors, have been developed. Other sensors such as a blood pressure sensor, EEG sensor and a PDA for BSN interface are under development.

=== Wireless communication in the U.S. ===
The FCC has approved the allocation of 40 MHz of spectrum bandwidth for medical BAN low-power, wide-area radio links at the 2360–2400 MHz band. This will allow off-loading MBAN communication from the already saturated standard Wi-Fi spectrum to a standard band.

The 2360–2390 MHz frequency range is available on a secondary basis. The FCC will expand the existing Medical Device Radiocommunication (MedRadio) Service in Part 95 of its rules. MBAN devices using the band will operate under a 'license-by-rule' basis which eliminates the need to apply for individual transmitter licenses. Usage of the 2360–2390 MHz frequencies are restricted to indoor operation at health-care facilities and are subject to registration and site approval by coordinators to protect aeronautical telemetry primary usage. Operation in the 2390–2400 MHz band is not subject to registration or coordination and may be used in all areas including residential.

== Challenges ==
Problems with the use of this technology could include:

- Data quality: Data generated and collected through BANs can play a key role in the patient care process. It is essential that the quality of this data is of a high standard to ensure that the decisions made are based on the best information possible
- Data management: As BANs generate large volumes of data, the need to manage and maintain these datasets is of utmost importance.
- Sensor validation: Pervasive sensing devices are subject to inherent communication and hardware constraints including unreliable wired/wireless network links, interference and limited power reserves. This may result in erroneous datasets being transmitted back to the end user. It is of the utmost importance especially within a healthcare domain that all sensor readings are validated. This helps to reduce false alarm generation and to identify possible weaknesses within the hardware and software design.
- Data consistency: Data residing on multiple mobile devices and wireless patient notes need to be collected and analysed in a seamless fashion. Within body area networks, vital patient datasets may be fragmented over a number of nodes and across a number of networked PCs or Laptops. If a medical practitioner's mobile device does not contain all known information then the quality of patient care may degrade.
- Security: Considerable effort would be required to make WBAN transmission secure and accurate. It would have to be made sure that the patient secure data is only derived from each patient's dedicated WBAN system and is not mixed up with other patient's data. Further, the data generated from WBAN should have secure and limited access. Although security is a high priority in most networks, little study has been done in this area for WBANs. As WBANs are resource-constrained in terms of power, memory, communication rate and computational capability, security solutions proposed for other networks may not be applicable to WBANs. Confidentiality, authentication, integrity, and freshness of data together with availability and secure management are the security requirements in WBAN. The IEEE 802.15.6 standard, which is latest standard for WBAN, tried to provide security in WBAN. However, it has several security problems. Researchers have studied using physiological signal-based security for BANs.
- Interoperability: WBAN systems would have to ensure seamless data transfer across standards such as Bluetooth, Zigbee etc. to promote information exchange, plug and play device interaction. Further, the systems would have to be scalable, ensure efficient migration across networks and offer uninterrupted connectivity.
- System devices: The sensors used in WBAN would have to be low on complexity, small in form factor, light in weight, power efficient, easy to use and reconfigurable. Further, the storage devices need to facilitate remote storage and viewing of patient data as well as access to external processing and analysis tools via the Internet.
- Energy vs. accuracy: Sensors' activation policy should be determined to optimizing the trade-off between the BAN's power consumption versus the probability of patient's health state mis-classification. High power consumption often results in more accurate observations on the patient's health state and vice versa.
- Privacy: People might consider the WBAN technology as a potential threat to freedom if the applications go beyond "secure" medical usage. Social acceptance would be key to this technology finding a wider application.
- Interference: The wireless link used for body sensors should reduce the interference and increase the coexistence of sensor node devices with other network devices available in the environment. This is especially important for large scale implementation of WBAN systems.
- Cost: Today's consumers expect low cost health monitoring solutions which provide high functionality. WBAN implementations will need to be cost optimized to be appealing alternatives to health conscious consumers.
- Constant monitoring: Users may require different levels of monitoring, for example those at risk of cardiac ischemia may want their WBANs to function constantly, while others at risk of falls may only need WBANs to monitor them while they are walking or moving. The level of monitoring influences the amount of energy required and the life cycle of the BAN before the energy source is depleted.
- Constrained deployment: The WBAN needs to be wearable, lightweight and non intrusive. It should not alter or encumber the user's daily activities. The technology should ultimately be transparent to the user i.e., it should perform its monitoring tasks without the user realising it.
- Consistent performance: The performance of the WBAN should be consistent. Sensor measurements should be accurate and calibrated, even when the WBAN is switched off and switched on again. The wireless links should be robust and work under various user environments.

== See also ==
- Energy harvesting
- EnOcean
