= FiRa Consortium =

American non-profit organization

- Abbreviation: FiRa
- Formation: August 1, 2019; 7 years ago
- Type: Standards consortium
- Headquarters: Beaverton, Oregon, United States
- Region served: Worldwide
- Members: Open
- Website: www.firaconsortium.org

The FiRa Consortium (FiRa – "fine ranging") is a non-profit organization that promotes the use of ultra-wideband technology for use cases such as access control, location-based services, and device-to-device services. UWB offers fine ranging and secure capabilities and operates in the available 6–9 GHz spectrum. Founded on August 1, 2019, by ASSA ABLOY, Bosch, HID Global, NXP Semiconductors, and Samsung, the consortium aims to certify UWB products for conformity to defined standards of interoperability. In June 2020, the FiRa Consortium and the UWB Alliance announced their formal liaison to "accelerate the development and adoption of UWB technology".

== Association with IEEE 802.15.4 ==
The FiRa Consortium builds on to the IEEE 802.15.4/4z and future iterations and enhancements High Rate PHY (HRP) with an interoperable HRP standard that includes performance requirements, test methods and procedures, and a certification program based on the IEEE's profiled features. An additional application layer is designed to discover UWB devices and services and configure them in an interoperable manner. Furthermore, FiRa plans to develop service-specific protocols for multiple verticals that leverage access control, location-based services, and device-to-device services.

== Members ==
FiRa's key stakeholders include chip manufacturers, device manufacturers, system integrators, service providers, technology provider, test tool developers, and test labs. Following the initial sponsor members, the ASSA ABLOY Group (HID Global), NXP Semiconductors, Samsung Electronics, and Bosch, the FiRa Consortium counts more than 100 members in seven different membership categories.

== FiRa Certification ==
In May 2020, the FiRa Consortium has released their first technical requirement specifications for the UWB PHY and MAC layers. Both specifications are based on the High Rate Pulse (HRP) portion of the IEEE 802.15.4-2015 technical specification and 802.15.4z/D8 draft amendment for fine-ranging UWB technology. The UWB MAC Technical Requirements defines elements such as how ranging protocol works, types of ranging that are supported, the parameters and format of the messages that are exchanged, and how ranging messages are encrypted. Similarly, the PHY Technical Requirements Specification document leverages select portions of the IEEE specification to facilitate interoperability between FiRa Consortium Certified UWB-enabled products. In October 2021, the FiRa Consortium launched the initial phase of its certification program which is centered around MAC/PHY conformance testing.

The FiRa Certified™ mark helps to identify interoperable UWB devices. It can only be used once a device has successfully completed the FiRa Device Certification Process performed by an independent Authorized Test Laboratory (ATLs).

== See also ==
- Ultra-wideband
- 802.15.4
