= Programming station =

Type of computer

A programming station is a terminal or computer that allows a machine operator to control a machine remotely, rather than being on the factory or shop floor. The programming station usually provides all the functionality including management and diagnostics that are found on the main control station.
