= C-UWB =

Continuous pulse ultra-wideband technology

C-UWB is an initialism for continuous pulse ultra-wideband (UWB) technology. C-UWB derives its bandwidth by virtue of the short time duration of the individual pulses. Information can be imparted (modulated) on UWB signals (pulses) by encoding the polarity of the pulse, the amplitude of the pulse, or by using orthogonal pulse shape modulation. Polarity modulation is analogous to BPSK in conventional RF technology. In orthogonal wave shape modulation, two orthogonal UWB pulse shapes are employed. These are further polarity modulated in a fashion analogous to QPSK in conventional radio technology. Preferably, the modulating data bits are scrambled or "whitened" to randomize the occurrences of ones and zeros. The pulses are sent contiguously as a continuous stream, hence the bit rate can equal the pulse rate.

C-UWB systems were demonstrated in 2008 at channel pulse rates in excess of 1.3 giga-pulses per second, supporting forward error correction encoded data rates in excess of 675 Mbit/s. Continuous pulse UWB technology was the basis of one of the physical layers specified by the IEEE 802.15.4a standard.
