= UWB Forum =

Industry body, promoted ultra-wideband

- Successor: UWB Alliance
- Formation: 2004
- Dissolved: 2006

The UWB Forum was an industry organization promoting interoperable ultra-wideband (UWB) wireless computer networking products from multiple vendors. It was founded in 2004 and disbanded around 2006.

== History ==
The UWB Forum was founded in 2004, promoting acronyms such as DS-UWB and CSM. Within the Institute of Electrical and Electronics Engineers, the IEEE_802.15.3a effort attempted to provide a higher speed ultra-wideband enhancement amendment to IEEE 802.15.3 for applications which involved imaging and multimedia.

That standardisation attempt failed due to contrasting approaches between the WiMedia Alliance and UWB Forum. On January 19, 2006 IEEE 802.15.3a task group (TG3a) members voted to withdraw the December 2002 project authorization request (PAR) that initiated the development of high data rate wireless standards. The IEEE 802.15.3a did consolidate 23 physical layer specifications into two proposals: multi-band orthogonal frequency-division multiplexing (MB-OFDM), supported by the WiMedia Alliance, and direct sequence - UWB (DS-UWB), supported by the UWB Forum.

Major members Motorola and Freescale Semiconductor left the group in April 2006 and the UWB Forum disbanded. Its website remained into mid-2007.

== UWB Alliance ==
On December 19, 2018, the UWB Alliance was officially launched to promote interoperable ultra-wideband (UWB) wireless computer networking products from multiple vendors. The founding members include: Hyundai, Kia, Zebra, Decawave, Alteros, Novelda, and Ubisense.
