= Wireless USB =

Wireless radio communication protocol

- Status: Withdrawn
- Year started: 2004
- First published: February 2005
- Website: usb.org/developers/wusb at the Wayback Machine (archived 2007-10-12)

Wireless USB is a short-range, high-bandwidth Wireless radio communication protocol version of the Universal Serial Bus (USB) created by the Wireless USB Promoter Group. It is unrelated to Wi-Fi and Cypress Wireless USB. It was maintained by the WiMedia Alliance which ceased operations in 2009.

Wireless USB is based on the WiMedia Alliance's Ultra-WideBand (UWB) common radio platform, which is capable of sending 480 Mbit/s at distances up to 3 metres (9.8 ft) and 110 Mbit/s at distances up to 10 metres (33 ft). It is designed to operate in the 3.1 to 10.6 GHz frequency range, although local regulatory policies may restrict the legal operating range in some countries.

Development and commercial adoption of Wireless USB declined after the dissolution of the WiMedia Alliance in 2009 and the industry's transition toward Wi-Fi, Bluetooth and 60 GHz wireless technologies such as WiGig. The standard is now considered obsolete.

Wireless USB support in the Linux kernel was deprecated in version 5.4 and completely removed in version 5.7 due to a lack of active users and hardware.

== Overview ==
The rationale for this specification was the overwhelming success of USB as a base for peripherals everywhere; cited reasons include extreme ease of use and low cost, which allow the existence of a ubiquitous bidirectional, fast port architecture. The definition of Ultra-WideBand (UWB) matches the capabilities and transfer rates of USB very closely (from 1.5 and 12 Mbit/s up to 480 Mbit/s for USB 2.0) and makes for a natural wireless extension of USB in the short range (3 meters, up to 10 at a reduced rate of 110 Mbit/s). Still, there was no physical bus to power the peripherals any more, and the absence of wires means that some properties that are usually taken for granted in USB systems need to be achieved by other means.

The goal of the specification was to preserve the functional model of USB, based on intelligent hosts and behaviorally simple devices, while allowing it to operate in a wireless environment and keeping security on a par with the levels offered by traditional wired systems. It also seeks to be comparably power-efficient. To accomplish this, it uses an existing standard that defines a suitable physical layer and medium access control, through which the desired performance can be met, and it adds to it a convergence layer to merge both architectural efforts.

W-USB was defined as a bus, albeit logical and not physical, which can simultaneously connect a host with a number of peripherals. The host divides the available bandwidth through a time-division multiple access (TDMA) strategy. It maintains the ability of USB to safely manage devices on the fly. Hosts can communicate with devices up to 10 meters away.

== Uses ==
Wireless USB had potential uses in game controllers, printers, scanners, digital cameras, portable media players, hard disk drives and USB flash drives. It was also suitable for transferring parallel video streams, using USB over ultra-wideband protocols.

== Development ==
The Wireless USB Promoter Group was formed in February 2004 to define the Wireless USB protocol. The group consisted of Agere Systems (now merged with LSI Corporation), Hewlett-Packard, Intel, Microsoft, NEC Corporation, Philips Semiconductors, and Samsung.

In May 2005, the Wireless USB Promoter Group announced version 1.0 of the Wireless USB specification.

In June 2006, five companies showed the first multi-vendor interoperability demonstration of wireless USB. A laptop with an Intel host adapter using an Alereon PHY was used to transfer high-definition video from a Philips wireless semiconductor with a Staccato Communications PHY, all using Microsoft Windows XP drivers developed for Wireless USB.

In October 2006, the U.S. Federal Communications Commission (FCC) approved Host Wire Adapter (HWA) and Device Wire Adapter (DWA) wireless USB products from WiQuest Communications for both outdoor and indoor use. The first retail product was shipped by IOGEAR using Alereon, Intel, and NEC silicon in mid-2007. Around the same time, Belkin, Dell, Lenovo, and D-Link began shipping products that incorporated WiQuest technology. These products included embedded cards in notebook PCs or adapters for those PCs that do not currently include wireless USB. In 2008, a new wireless USB docking station from Kensington was made available through Dell. This product was unique as it was the first product on the market to support video and graphics over a USB connection by using DisplayLink USB graphics technology. Kensington released a Wireless USB Universal Docking Station in August 2008 for wireless connectivity between a notebook PC and an external monitor, speakers, and existing wired USB peripherals. Imation announced the Q4 2008 availability of a new external Wireless HDD.

On March 16, 2009, the WiMedia Alliance announced transfer agreements for the WiMedia ultra-wideband (UWB) specifications. WiMedia transferred specifications to the Bluetooth Special Interest Group (SIG), the Wireless USB Promoter Group, and the USB Implementers Forum. After the technology transfer, the WiMedia Alliance ceased operations. In October 2009, the Bluetooth Special Interest Group dropped the development of UWB as part of the alternative MAC/PHY, Bluetooth 3.0/High Speed technology. A small, but significant, number of former WiMedia members had not and would not sign up to the necessary agreements for the intellectual property transfer. The Bluetooth group then turned its attention from UWB to 60 GHz.

Version 1.1 of the Wireless USB specification, announced on 29 September 2010, is the last major revision published for this standard and remains the latest finalized version. Since then the technology has not seen further specification updates or active development, and Wireless USB is now considered obsolete with no significant hardware or standards updates after 2010.

It delivered several backwards-compatible improvements: UWB upper band support for frequencies 6 GHz and above, improved power management and consumption, and support for NFC and proximity based association.

== Protocol architecture ==
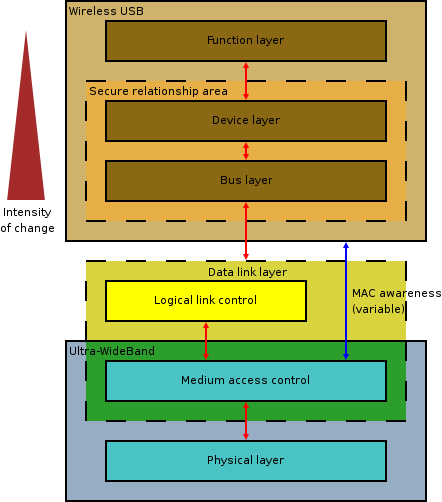
Wireless USB protocol stack

As mentioned, the USB model is preserved, and generally minor adjustments made to fit the specific needs of a wireless system. The changes are as follows, from top to bottom:

- The function layer only suffers minor changes to increase efficiency and support isochronism.
- The device layer includes wireless-oriented security and device management features.
- The bus layer does not change its functionality, but is substantially adapted for efficiency and security on wireless networks.

=== Changes to USB ===
Replacing copper wires in the bus layer introduces uncertainty about the actual state of host–device connections and, more importantly, exposes communications to any device within the signal's range, whereas wired connections were comparatively secure. Therefore, an explicit secure relationship must be established. To enable this, the bus and device layers provide the necessary resources for the function layer. Each W-USB transmission is encrypted by the bus layer without disrupting communication between layers.

The bus follows a TDMA-based polling approach supervised by the host. A transfer is formed by three parts: a token, data, and a handshake. For efficiency reasons, several tokens containing timing information for the devices can be grouped into one, thus forming transaction groups. Flow control and packet sizes are adjusted for power efficiency, while respecting the high-level pipe model of communication between source and destination.

Even preserving the USB model typical error rates in wireless media require modifications in the mechanisms used to achieve said model: among others, data handshakes and buffering.

UWB defines both PHY and MAC layers, which need to be integrated in the W-USB model. In particular, MAC is joined with the logical link control (LLC) sublayer to form the link layer, responsible for encryption/decryption, PHY error management and synchronization, while PHY itself covers the correctness of headers, not payloads.

The MAC layer is particularly relevant to W-USB. It uses superframes divided in 256 time slots, the first of which are dedicated to the transfer of beaconing information. Slots can further be allocated to meet the necessities of clusters of devices, also identified by MMC's (see below). A host maintains one or more W-USB communication channels and is fully aware of the MAC layer, whereas a device only needs to use the defined W-USB interface to communicate through existing channels.

There are three degrees of MAC consciousness in devices. The highest of these corresponds to a self-beaconing device, which is able to perform beaconing on its own. The following degree represents directed-beaconing devices, which are unaware of MAC frames and have limited beaconing capabilities, depending on the host to detect and beacon for nearby devices. Lastly there are non-beaconing devices, which have a very limited ability to transmit and receive; on the other hand, devices which are undetectable by the host can not be affected by these devices, nor can affect them.

Thus, non-beaconing devices can only operate in very close vicinity to the host. Directed- and self-beaconing devices must be able to identify their hidden neighbors, which they do by emitting beacons. On their end, hosts manage global timers with the precision the physical medium requires (20 ppm). Channel time is sent within MMC's, and it is used for slot allocation, so it is important that hosts perform accurate beaconing. Devices may as well beacon reservation declarations.

The superframe includes device notification time slots for asynchronous transfers initiated by the devices (which do not use pipes, but instead tap the bus layer directly); the host dynamically assigns slots as needed. Besides these, W-USB transactions between the host and endpoints are carried out as in USB.

== Data transport architecture ==
Transactions use TDMA microscheduling while adhering to USB semantics. A split-transaction protocol is used to allow multiple transactions to be carried out simultaneously. This is related to the transaction group concept, which consists of a microscheduled management command (MMC) and allocated time slots for the execution of its associated workload.

Wireless data transfers tend to incur in very significant overheads; to mitigate this W-USB replaces these with the burst mode data phase, which groups one or more data packets which reducing packet delimiters and separation gaps, in contrast with the USB rule of one data packet per transaction. The extent to which this practice is applied can be adjusted, resulting in a varying degree of equity between competing devices.

The specification defines four particular data transfer types; their identifying features are summarized here.

- Bulk transfers tap the channel as bandwidth is available. Delivery is guaranteed, but neither transfer rate nor latency are, though the host can attempt to leverage pending transfers or endpoints. They are used for high-volume transfers exhibiting a sharp time-varying behavior. They use unidirectional pipes.
- Interrupt transfers serve short transactions which demand high reliability and low latency. Maximum service period is guaranteed, as are a number of retries during said period.
- Isochronous transfers provide guaranteed transfer rates and bounded latency for transmission attempts, as well as on-average constant data rate (although dependent on the medium, usually comparable to the rates achievable by wired USB). There is also at least one guaranteed retry during the service period, and it supports additional reliability against error bursts by adding delay to the stream according to buffering capacity; payload sizes can be adjusted. Still, it may eventually be necessary to discard the oldest data in the buffers (the receiver can be informed of the amount of information discarded while the channel is not usable). Hosts will only discard data if the presentation time for a packet expires.
- Control transfers are the same as in USB 2.0. The system uses a best-effort policy, but software may restrict channel access and available bandwidth for devices.

Power management can also affect data transport, since devices may control their power use at their discretion. The fact that the communications protocol is based on TDMA means that both host and devices know exactly when their presence is not required, and can use this to enter power saving modes. Devices may turn off their radios transparently to the host while maintaining their connections. They can also turn off over extended periods of time if they previously notify the host, as they will ignore all communications from said host. Eventually, the device will trigger the wakeup procedure and check for pending work.

In turn, the host will usually turn its radio off when it is not needed. If it decides to stop the channel, be in temporarily or to enter hibernation or shutdown states, it must notify the devices before it can do so.

== Compatibility options for older hardware ==
The WUSB architecture allows up to 127 devices to connect directly to a host. Because there are no wires or ports, there is no longer a need for hubs.

However, to facilitate migration from wired to wireless, WUSB introduced a new Device Wire Adapter (DWA) class. Sometimes referred to as a "WUSB hub", a DWA allows existing USB 2.0 devices to be used wirelessly with a WUSB host.

WUSB host capability can be added to existing PCs through the use of a Host Wire Adapter (HWA). The HWA is a USB 2.0 device that attaches externally to a desktop or laptop's USB port or internally to a laptop's MiniCard interface.

WUSB also supports dual-role devices (DRDs), which in addition to being a WUSB device, can function as a host with limited capabilities. For example, a digital camera could act as a device when connected to a computer and as a host when transferring pictures directly to a printer.

== Connectivity ==
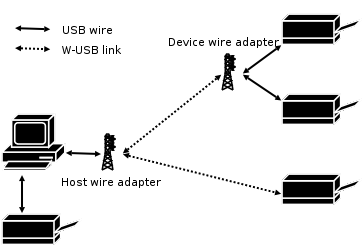
W-USB interacts with wired USB via wire adapters

W-USB can form true USB systems, formed by a host, devices and interconnection support. It implements the USB hub–spoke model, in which up to 127 wireless devices can form point-to-point links (spokes) with the host (the hub). The host controller is unique in the system and is usually embedded in a working computer, though it could be connected to it through a simple USB connection, possibly wireless as well. Such a topology is similar to a star network (but all communications are strictly point-to-point, never between devices).

In order to allow common wired USB devices to be connected, the specification defines device wire adapters. Likewise, hosts connect to W-USB systems through use of a host wire adapter. Even though the physical layer is based on Ultra-WideBand, W-USB devices have a fully compliant USB interface. The physical layer may support a wide range of transfer rates, of which three are defined as mandatorily supported: 53.3, 106.7 and 200 Mbit/s, all other possible UWB rates being optional for devices (hosts must support them all).

W-USB devices are categorized in the same way as traditional USB. Because of the existence of wire adapters, traditional USB hubs are not needed. A device supports one or more communication pipes to the host, and allocates endpoint 0 for the USB control pipe. Device type information is available through this pipe.

Connections with the host are created by means of an establishment message sent at some point. Both host and device can then proceed to authenticate using their unique keys; if the process succeeds, the host assigns a unique USB address to the device, after which the device becomes visible to the USB protocol. Because the connectivity model allows for on-the-fly, unannounced disconnection, connections must always remain active. Aside from host- or device-forced disconnections, long inactivity periods may trigger the same termination mechanisms.

In addition, W-USB hosts have other responsibilities which go beyond those of a wired host; namely, their MAC sublayer is responsible for supervising the suitability of device MAC layers. If needed, this requires assisting them in their beaconing duties and processing the beaconing data that could be sent to them. Furthermore, the UWB radio and associated bandwidth may be shared with other entities, and the host must make sure that the defined policies are satisfied; according to shared use (which may be coordinated to avoid interference) it will be able to offer full or partial functionality.

== Relation to ultra-wideband ==
UWB is a general term for radio communication using pulses of energy which spread emitted Radio Frequency energy over 500 MHz+ of spectrum or exceeding 20% fractional bandwidth within the frequency range of 3.1 GHz to 10.6 GHz as defined by the FCC ruling issued for UWB in February 2002. UWB is not specific to WiMedia or any other company or group and there are in fact a number of groups and companies developing UWB technology totally unrelated to WiMedia. WUSB was a protocol promulgated by the USB Implementers Forum that used WiMedia's UWB radio platform. Other protocols that announced their intention to use WiMedia's UWB radio platform included Bluetooth and the WiMedia Logical Link Control Protocol.

== Wireless USB vs. 60 GHz ==
A few issues differentiate Wireless USB from other proposed/competing standards that utilize 60 GHz band like WiGig:

Line of sight
At 60 GHz, radio communication is blocked by any intervening object, which implies the need for open line of sight. Wireless USB was based on the Ultra-WideBand (UWB) platform, which operates in the 3.1 to 10.6 GHz frequency range, and thus can pass through intervening bodies.
Mobility
The 60 GHz technology was appealing to the wireless video market because it was supposed to deliver multi-gigabit-speed wireless communications. In order to support such heavy demands, the underlying MAC layer should have been able to process this huge amount of data. For these requirements, the 60 GHz-based products needed higher power consumption, and more electronics, which are less suitable for mobile units or devices.

== Comparison of digital RF systems ==
Wireless USB vs. 802.11a/b/g and Bluetooth
Specification	Wireless USB specification Rev. 1.1	Bluetooth 4.0	Wi-Fi (IEEE 802.11n)	Wi-Fi (IEEE 802.11ac)	Bluetooth 2.1 + EDR
Frequency band	3.1 GHz–10.6 GHz	2.4 GHz	2.4 GHz and/or 5 GHz	5 GHz	2.4 GHz
Bandwidth	53–480 Mbit/s	1 Mbit/s	Max. 600 Mbit/s per band	Max. 6.93 Gbit/s per band	Max. 3 Mbit/s
Distance	3–10 m	unknown distance	100 m	unknown	1–100 m depending on output
Modulation	MB-OFDM	MB-OFDM	DSSS, DBPSK, DQPSK, CCK, OFDM	OFDM	GFSK
Standardization	September 2010	June 2010	September 2009	December 2013	July 2007

== Security ==
Robustness is one of the main concerns upon which the specification is built, and as such resource management and connection/disconnection of devices becomes even more important than in wired USB. Packet loss and corruption are dealt with through timeouts as well as hardware buffering, guaranteed retries (as mentioned in the description of transfer models) and other flow control methods. If synchronism policies cannot be maintained, errors can be handled either by hardware or software (retries, maximum number of retries failure, failure recovery decisions and so on).

The W-USB host tries to mitigate the unreliability of wireless mediums (a 10% error rate is considered acceptable for 1 kB packets; in wired media this value is usually around 10^{−9}) maintaining counters and statistics for each device and possible requesting information from them. It can also access and modify the transmit power control functions of each device, as well as change transmission parameters such as data payload size and bandwidth adjustments.

The focus is always on providing quality of service comparable to that of traditional USB. Wires offer a very high level of security (given a typical trusted working environment), so standard USB does not deal with it, even though it does not hinder its applicability or implementability; W-USB manages security explicitly, but instead of harnessing the base of UWB it designs a model which is valid for USB in general. Because of this, it must be added to the common USB device control plane.

For communication to exist, secure relationships must be established. These must have a defined purpose and restrict membership to the group, which serves as the base of trust to carry out the desired work. Within a wired systems, data transfers imply a controlled physical connection; this translates into the wireless domain through the concept of ownership: the user grants trust to the devices, which in turn prove this trust to others (interacting in so-called ceremonies) in order to form the desired associations. The USB address identifier is a token of the owner's trust. Applications may require other bases of trust not directly supported by this USB-specific model, in which case they can be implemented on top of the core USB stack.

Even more, trust needs to be maintained, otherwise it will expire. After receiving the group key of a cluster, a device must keep the connection alive by at least confirming its presence within each trust timeout boundary, which is set to four seconds. If it does not succeed at keeping up with this requirement, reauthentication is demanded.

Following the natural asymmetry of USB, the host initiates all processes (except signaling), security being no exception. Security requests are made to devices to find their security capabilities, after which the appropriate devices can be chosen. The standard, symmetric encryption method is AES-128 with CCM, though Public key encryption may be used for initial authentication (namely, only the sending of the initial CCM key), provided that the achieved security level is comparable (in practice by using 3072-bit RSA and SHA-256 for hashing).

Note that there is a difference between master keys and session keys. Master keys are long-lived and usually work as a shared secret or a means to distribute session keys, which in turn do not outlive the connection for which they were created and usually serve as the functional encryption/decryption mechanism. A specific header field indicates which of the possible keys is to be used. It is also important to note that replay prevention mechanisms require the keeping of counters which are updated on valid receptions. The range of these counters further limits the life of session keys.

== Competitors ==
Other forms of USB over wireless exist, such as those based on the competing direct sequence ultra-wideband technology by Cable-Free USB. The same was also true for other radio frequency based wire replacement systems which could carry USB. The result was that the name Certified Wireless USB was adopted to allow consumers to identify which products would be adherent to the standard and would support the correct protocol and data rates.

There was also USB over IP, which may have used IP-based networking to transfer USB traffic wirelessly. For example, with proper drivers the host side may have used 802.11a/b/g/n/ac Wi-Fi (or wired Ethernet) to communicate with the device.

=== Media Agnostic USB ===
As of 2013, Media Agnostic USB (MA USB) is a specification being developed by the USB Implementers Forum. It is intended to enable communication using the Universal Serial Bus (USB) protocol to be performed over a wide range of physical communication media, including WiFi and WiGig wireless networks. The protocol is being developed from the base of the Wi-Fi Alliance's previous WiGig Serial Extension specification.

Media Agnostic USB is distinct from, and should not be confused with, previous wireless USB protocols such as Certified Wireless USB.

== See also ==
- Bluetooth
- DASH7
- Wibree
- WirelessHD
- Zigbee
- IEEE 802.15.4
- List of device bandwidths
- TransferJet
- USB
- USB Implementers Forum
- Ultra-WideBand
