= Personal area network =

Short distance computer network

A personal area network (PAN) is a computer network for interconnecting electronic devices within an individual person's workspace. A PAN provides data transmission among devices such as computers, smartphones, tablets, and personal digital assistants. PANs can be used for communication among the personal devices themselves, or for connecting to a higher-level network and the Internet, where one master device takes up the role as gateway.

A PAN may be carried over wired interfaces such as USB, but may be carried wirelessly, in which case it is specifically called a wireless personal area network (WPAN) and uses short-distance wireless network technology such as IrDA, Wireless USB, Bluetooth, NearLink, or Zigbee. The reach of a WPAN varies from a few centimeters to a few meters. WPANs specifically tailored for low-power operation of wireless sensors are sometimes called low-power personal area networks (LPPANs) to better distinguish them from low-power wide-area networks (LPWANs).

== Wired ==
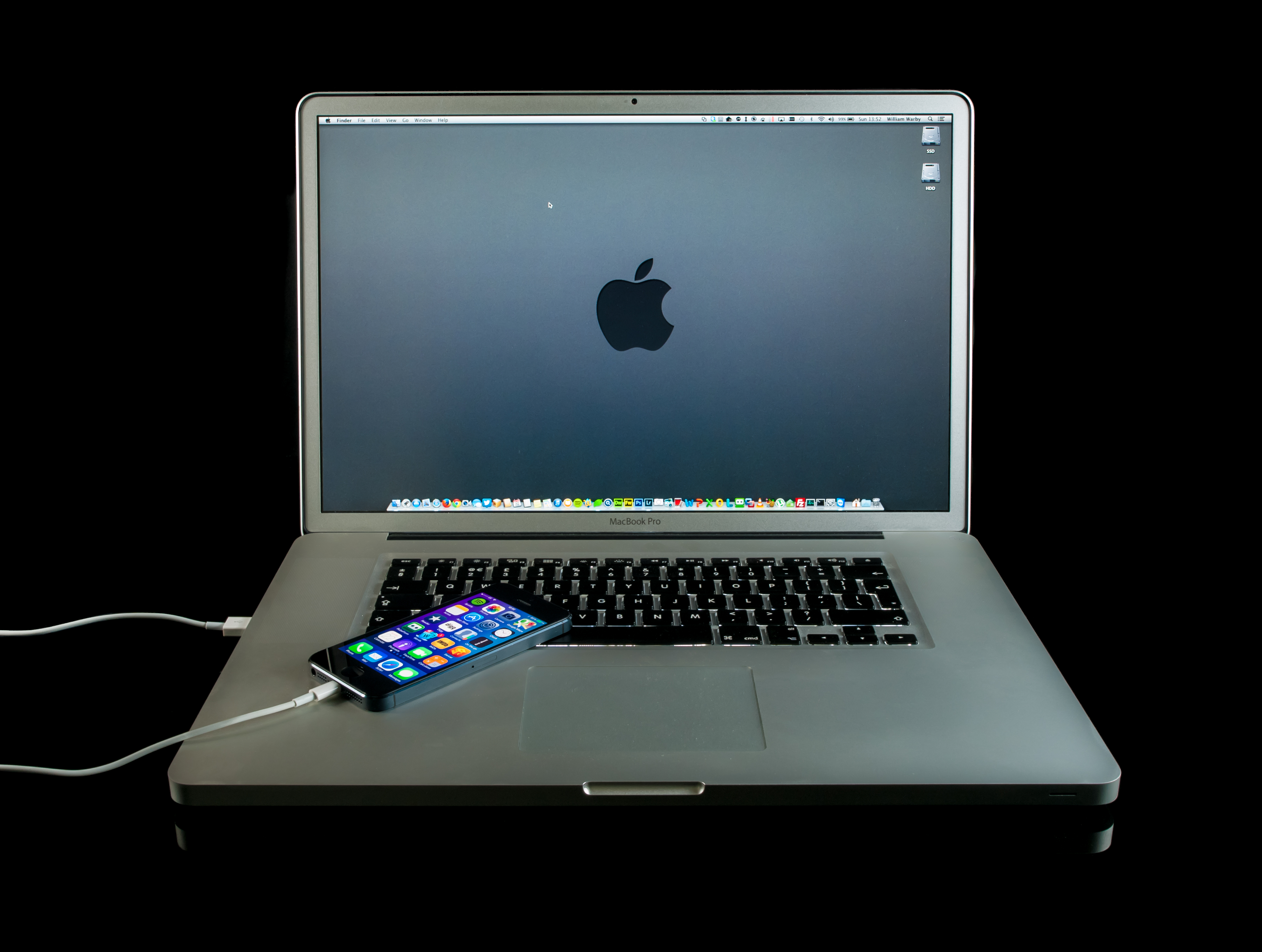
A cell phone connected to a laptop using the USB interface, letting them communicate with each other, is a simple example of a wired personal area network (PAN)

Wired personal area networks provide short connections between peripherals. Example technologies include USB, IEEE 1394, and Thunderbolt.

== Wireless ==
A wireless personal area network (WPAN) is a personal area network in which the connections are wireless. The IEEE 802.15 working group has produced standards for several types of PANs operating in the ISM band, including Bluetooth. The Infrared Data Association (IrDA) has produced standards for WPANs that operate using infrared communications.

=== Bluetooth ===
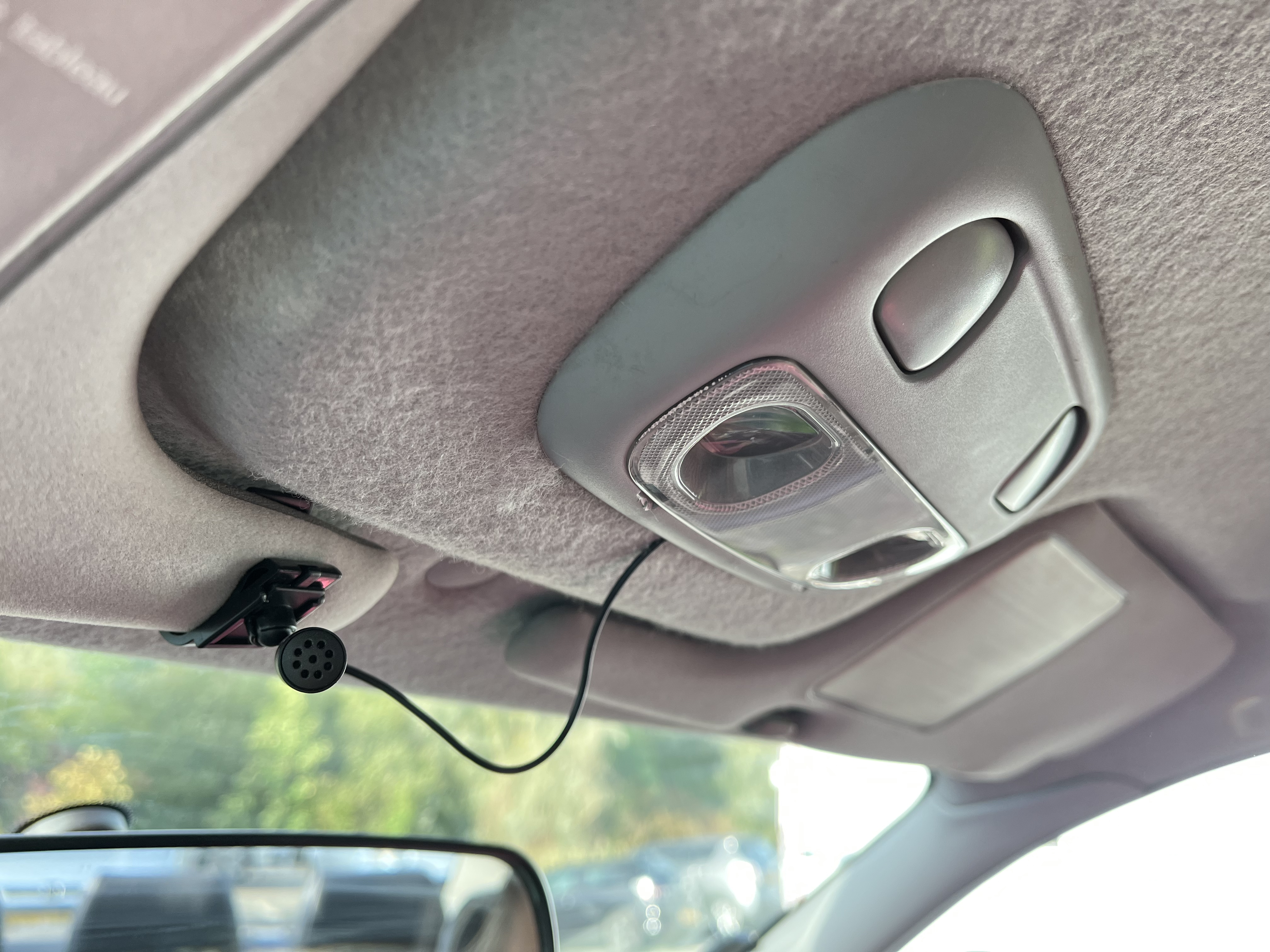
An in-car microphone connected to a Bluetooth receiver designed to receive calls from a connected cell phone - an example of a WPAN

Bluetooth uses short-range radio waves. Uses in a WPAN include, for example, Bluetooth devices such as keyboards, pointing devices, audio headsets, and printers that may connect to smartwatches, smartphones, or computers. A Bluetooth WPAN is called a piconet, and is composed of up to 8 active devices and a potentially large number of additional devices in parked mode, organized around a single controlling device (the central), with all others (peripherals) communicating through it. A piconet typically has a range of 10 metres (33 ft), although ranges of up to 100 metres (330 ft) can be reached under ideal circumstances. Long-range Bluetooth routers with augmented antenna arrays connect Bluetooth devices up to 1,000 feet (300 m).

With Bluetooth mesh networking, the range and number of devices are extended by using mesh-networking techniques to relay information from one device to another. Such a network does not have a central device and may or may not be treated as a WPAN.

=== IrDA ===
IrDA uses infrared light, which has a frequency below the human eye's sensitivity. Infrared is used in other wireless communications applications, such as in remote controls. Typical WPAN devices that use IrDA include printers, keyboards, and other serial communication interfaces.

== See also ==
- Ambient networks
- DASH7
- 6LoWPAN
- IEEE 802.15.4 – Low-rate wireless personal area network
- Microchip implant (human)
- RuBee
- Ultra-wideband and FM-UWB networks
- Wireless ad hoc network (WANET)
