= WiMedia Alliance =

Former organization for adoption of ultra-wideband

- Successor: UWB Alliance
- Formation: 2002
- Dissolved: 2010
- Formerly called: Wireless Multimedia Alliance

The WiMedia Alliance was a non-profit industry trade group that promoted the adoption, regulation, standardization and multi-vendor interoperability of ultra-wideband (UWB) technologies. It existed from about 2002 through 2009.

== History ==
The Wireless Multimedia Alliance was founded by 2002.

The WiMedia Alliance developed reference technical specifications including:

- Physical layers and media access control (MAC) layers
- Convergence architecture to provide coexistence and fairness including support for multiple applications
- A protocol adaptation layer for the Internet Protocol
- IP-based application profiles

The WiMedia ultra-wideband (UWB) common radio platform incorporated MAC layer and PHY layer specifications based on multi-band orthogonal frequency-division multiplexing (MB-OFDM). It was intended for short-range multimedia file transfers at data rates of 480 Mbit/s and beyond with low power consumption, and operates in the 3.1 to 10.6 GHz UWB spectrum. WiMedia UWB was promoted for personal computers, consumer electronics, mobile devices and automotive networks. WiMedia Alliance and MultiBand OFDM Alliance Special Interest Group (MBOA-SIG, promoted by Intel) merged into a single organization in 2005. The merged group operated as the WiMedia Alliance.

The ultra-wideband system provided a wireless personal area network (WPAN) with data payload communication capabilities of 53.3, 55, 80, 106.67, 110, 160, 200, 320, 480, 640, 800, 960, and 1024 Mbit/s. The WiMedia UWB platform was complementary to WPAN technologies such as Bluetooth 3.0, Certified Wireless USB, the 1394 Trade Group’s “Wireless FireWire” Protocol Adaptation Layer (PAL) (Non-IP Peer to Peer architecture) and Wireless TCP/IP - Digital Living Network Alliance. Different wireless protocols can operate within the same wireless personal area network without interference. In addition to these, many other industry protocols can reside on top of the WiMedia UWB platform. Those include Ethernet, Digital Visual Interface (DVI) and High-Definition Multimedia Interface (HDMI). The WiMedia PHY specification has an over-the-air uncoded capability of more than 1024 Mbit/s; the specification was promoted to support wireless video, operating at multiple Gbit/s data rates.

The WiMedia Network (formerly WiNET) is a protocol adaptation layer that builds on the WiMedia UWB common radio platform to augment the convergence platform with TCP/IP services.

Certified Wireless USB can operate in two ways:

- Coexistence Wireless USB operates on top of Wimedia UWB PHY - Wimedia UWB MAC - Convergence Layer.
- Pure Wireless USB operates directly on top of Wimedia UWB PHY.

Bluetooth, Wireless 1394, IP (WiMedia Network) operate on top of Wimedia UWB PHY - Wimedia UWB MAC - Convergence Layer like Coexistence Wireless USB.

Within the WiMedia MAC specification is the MAC Convergence Architecture (WiMCA) that allows applications to share UWB resources. WiMCA defines a number of policies, including channel-time utilization; secure association, authentication and data transfer; device and WPAN management; quality of service; discovery of services; and power management.

Board members of the alliance included Alereon, CSR plc, Olympus Corporation, Samsung and Wisair.

By early 2006, implementations were delayed by standardization issues. On March 16, 2009, the WiMedia Alliance announced technology transfer agreements for WiMedia ultra-wideband (UWB) specifications. WiMedia transferred all specifications, including work on future high speed and power optimized implementations, to the Bluetooth Special Interest Group (SIG), Wireless USB Promoter Group and the USB Implementers Forum. After the technology transfer, marketing and related administrative items, the WiMedia Alliance ceased operations in 2010.

=== UWB Alliance ===
On December 19, 2018, the UWB Alliance was officially launched to promote the adoption, regulation, standardization and multi-vendor interoperability of ultra-wideband (UWB) technologies. The founding members include: Hyundai, Kia, Zebra, Decawave, Alteros, Novelda, and Ubisense.

== Standardization ==
=== IEEE ===
IEEE 802.15.3a was an attempt to provide a higher speed UWB PHY enhancement amendment to IEEE 802.15.3 for applications which involve imaging and multimedia.

The attempt to create an Institute of Electrical and Electronics Engineers (IEEE) ultra-wideband standard failed because of several factors.

First, based on execution of the approved IEEE 802.15.3a Task Group down selection procedure, there were only two proposals remaining. Each of the remaining proposals contained mutually exclusive communication architectures. Neither proposer's radio could communicate with the other. One proposal was a merger of a novel OFDM architecture proposed by Texas Instruments and eventually adopted by the majority of the industry, by the USB-IF for Wireless USB and by the Bluetooth SIG for high speed Bluetooth. This merged proposal became known as the MB-OFDM proposal and was sponsored by Texas Instruments as a member of the Multi Band OFDM Alliance, which is now part of WiMedia. The other proposal was a merger between an original direct sequence pulse based design (DS-UWB) contributed by Xtreme Spectrum and DecaWave that was modified to include features of several other pulse based proposals. Ironically, after the dust settled through several years of each proposer bashing the other's technical implementation, both remaining proposals achieved nearly identical theoretical performance in terms of data throughput, channel robustness, overall design DC power consumption, and device cost. Not until actual WiMedia devices entered the market was shown that WiMedia's proposal and implementation did not come close to living up to its advertised specification of 480 Mbit/s.

Second, there were numerous attempts by each proposer to achieve both victory in the down selection vote, and then reach the 75% approval rating required for task group confirmation of the selected technical proposal, which never happened. In the first round of down selection, the MB-OFDM proposal was selected. Through several subsequent rounds of down selection, the selected proposal alternated between MB-OFDM and DS-UWB, with neither being able to achieve technical confirmation.

There were several attempts to create a compromise solution, the most notable was a proposal that would have allowed the MB-OFDM and DS-UWB radios to communicate with each other and share spectrum. Based on a concept called the Common Signaling Mode (CSM) it specified supporting a lower data rate than the minimum mandatory 110 Mbit/s, for purposes of spectrum coordination and allowing other elements necessary for proper operation of a wireless personal area network. The Common Signaling Mode (CSM) was proposed by John Santhoff of Pulse~LINK as a way forward for both competing proposals that would allow complete coexistence and at least minimal interoperability. Companies supporting the MB-OFDM proposal insisted that a common signaling mode was not needed or technically feasible and that their customer research supported a strict notion that only one physical layer (PHY) would be tolerated by the consumer market. Thus, even though the DS-UWB supporters embraced CSM as a bridge between the two proposals, the lack of acceptance by MB-OFDM supporters killed what turned out to be the best solution to achieve a compromise between the proposers. It's interesting to note that the concept of a Common Signaling Mode (CSM) was later adopted by IEEE 802.15.3c for the 60 GHz PHY layer and renamed Common Mode Signaling to solve the same two PHY problem.

The contest became so contentious that the originally elected Task Group Chair, Bob Heile, who was also the 802.15 Working Group Chair, resigned his position. Bob Heile was replaced by Jim Lansford, CTO of Alereon, and Gregg Rasor, Director of Ultrawideband Research and Development in Motorola Labs, who co-chaired IEEE 802.15.3a until its end. The idea of co-chairs was brought about in yet another attempt to forge a compromise that would generate an IEEE standard for ultrawideband.

Consequently, in the Spring of 2006, the IEEE 802.15.3a Task Group was officially disbanded by the IEEE Standards Association. On January 19, 2006, IEEE 802.15.3a task group (TG3a) members voted to recommend that the IEEE 802 Executive Committee ask NESCOM to withdraw the December 2002 project authorization request (PAR), which initiated the development of a high data rate UWB PHY amendment for the IEEE 802.15.3 WPAN standard.

The most commendable achievement of IEEE 802.15.3a was its consolidation of 23 UWB PHY specifications into two proposals using: Multi-Band Orthogonal Frequency Division Multiplexing (MB-OFDM) UWB, supported by the WiMedia Alliance, then adopted by the USB-IF for Wireless USB and by the Bluetooth SIG for high speed Bluetooth, while the Direct Sequence - UWB (DS-UWB) approach, supported by the UWB Forum, was abandoned.

=== ECMA ===
In December 2008, Ecma International released specification (ECMA-368 and ECMA-369) for UWB technology based on the WiMedia Ultra-Wideband (UWB) Common Radio Platform.

=== ETSI ===
ECMA-368 is also a European Telecommunications Standards Institute (ETSI) standard, ETSI TS 102 455).

=== ISO ===
The Ecma 368 and 369 standards were approved as ISO/IEC standards in 2007 respectively with numbers:

- ISO/IEC 26907:2007 - Information technology—Telecommunications and information exchange between systems—High Rate Ultra Wideband PHY and MAC Standard
- ISO/IEC 26908:2007 - Information technology—MAC-PHY Interface for ISO/IEC 26907.

== See also ==
- Wireless USB
- WirelessHD
- Wireless Gigabit Alliance
