= Ultra-wideband =

Very low energy, short range radio precise positioning

Ultra-wideband (UWB, ultra wideband, ultra-wide band and ultraband) is a radio technology that can use a very low energy level for short-range, high-bandwidth communications over a large portion of the radio spectrum. UWB has traditional applications in non-cooperative radar imaging. Most recent applications target sensor data collection, precise locating, and tracking. UWB support first appeared in high-end smartphones in 2019. For a detailed list of Ultra-wideband supported mobile devices, see List of UWB-enabled mobile devices.

== Characteristics ==
Ultra-wideband is a technology for transmitting information across a wide bandwidth (>500 MHz). This allows for the transmission of a large amount of signal energy without interfering with conventional narrowband and carrier wave transmission in the same frequency band. Regulatory limits in many countries allow for this efficient use of radio bandwidth, and enable high-data-rate personal area network (PAN) wireless connectivity, longer-range low-data-rate applications, and the transparent co-existence of radar and imaging systems with existing communications systems.

Ultra-wideband was formerly known as pulse radio, but the FCC and the International Telecommunication Union Radiocommunication Sector (ITU-R) currently define UWB as an antenna transmission for which emitted signal bandwidth exceeds the lesser of 500 MHz or 20% of the arithmetic center frequency. Thus, pulse-based systems—where each transmitted pulse occupies the UWB bandwidth (or an aggregate of at least 500 MHz of a narrow-band carrier; for example, orthogonal frequency-division multiplexing (OFDM))—can access the UWB spectrum under the rules.

=== Theory ===
A significant difference between conventional radio transmissions and UWB is that conventional systems transmit information by varying the power level, frequency, or phase (or a combination of these) of a sinusoidal wave. UWB transmissions transmit information by generating radio energy at specific time intervals and occupying a large bandwidth, thus enabling pulse-position or time modulation. The information can also be modulated on UWB signals (pulses) by encoding the polarity of the pulse, its amplitude and/or by using orthogonal pulses. UWB pulses can be sent sporadically at relatively low pulse rates to support time or position modulation, but can also be sent at rates up to the inverse of the UWB pulse bandwidth. Pulse-UWB systems have been demonstrated at channel pulse rates in excess of 1.3 billion pulses per second using a continuous stream of UWB pulses (Continuous Pulse UWB or C-UWB), while supporting forward error-correction encoded data rates in excess of 675 Mbit/s.

A UWB radio system can be used to determine the "time of flight" of the transmission at various frequencies. This helps overcome multipath propagation, since some of the frequencies have a line-of-sight trajectory, while other indirect paths have longer delays. With a cooperative symmetric two-way metering technique, distances can be measured to high resolution and accuracy.

== Applications ==
=== Real-time location ===
UWB is useful for real-time locating systems, and its precision capabilities and low power make it well-suited for radio-frequency-sensitive environments, such as hospitals. UWB is also useful for peer-to-peer fine ranging, which allows many applications based on relative distance between two entities.

UWB uses multiple techniques for location detection:

- Time of flight (ToF)
- Time difference of arrival (TDoA)
- Two-way ranging (TWR)
- Phase difference of arrival (PDoA)

While ToF and TWR focus on distance measurement, PDoA allows the system to estimate the Angle of arrival (AoA) by calculating the carrier phase shift across multiple antennas. When combined with ranging data, this enables precise 2D or 3D positioning using a single anchor, providing a critical technical foundation for mobile "follow-me" or applications and infrastructure-light tracking solutions.

=== Mobile devices with UWB capability ===
Apple launched the first three phones with ultra-wideband capabilities in September 2019, namely, the iPhone 11, iPhone 11 Pro, and iPhone 11 Pro Max. Apple also launched Series 6 of Apple Watch in September 2020, which features UWB, and their AirTags featuring this technology were revealed at a press event on April 20, 2021. The Samsung Galaxy Note 20 Ultra, Galaxy S21+, and Galaxy S21 Ultra also began supporting UWB, along with the Samsung Galaxy SmartTag+. The Xiaomi MIX 4 released in August 2021 supports UWB, and offers the capability of connecting to select AIoT devices.

The FiRa Consortium was founded in August 2019 to develop interoperable UWB ecosystems including mobile phones. Samsung, Xiaomi, and Oppo are currently members of the FiRa Consortium. In November 2020, Android Open Source Project received first patches related to an upcoming UWB API; "feature-complete" UWB support (exclusively for the sole use case of ranging between supported devices) was released in version 13 of Android.

=== Industrial applications ===
UWB is increasingly utilized in auto-follow and follow-me systems for autonomous mobile robots (AMRs) and smart vehicles. By integrating high-precision ranging with AoA/PDoA estimation, a mobile platform can autonomously track and follow a target tag in real-time. This methodology offers superior reliability in complex indoor environments where visual tracking may be compromised by lighting variations, occlusions, or identical target features.

=== Radar ===
Ultra-wideband gained widespread attention for its implementation in synthetic aperture radar (SAR) technology. Due to its high resolution capacities using lower frequencies, UWB SAR was heavily researched for its object-penetration ability. Starting in the early 1990s, the U.S. Army Research Laboratory (ARL) developed various stationary and mobile ground-, foliage-, and wall-penetrating radar platforms that served to detect and identify buried IEDs and hidden adversaries at a safe distance. Examples include the railSAR, the boomSAR, the SIRE radar, and the SAFIRE radar. ARL has also investigated the feasibility of whether UWB radar technology can incorporate Doppler processing to estimate the velocity of a moving target when the platform is stationary. While a 2013 report highlighted the issue with the use of UWB waveforms due to target range migration during the integration interval, more recent studies have suggested that UWB waveforms can demonstrate better performance compared to conventional Doppler processing as long as a correct matched filter is used.

Ultra-wideband pulse Doppler radars have also been used to monitor vital signs of the human body, such as heart rate and respiration signals as well as human gait analysis and fall detection. It serves as a potential alternative to continuous-wave radar systems since it involves less power consumption and a high-resolution range profile. However, its low signal-to-noise ratio has made it vulnerable to errors.

Ultra-wideband is also used in "see-through-the-wall" precision radar-imaging technology, precision locating and tracking (using distance measurements between radios), and precision time-of-arrival-based localization approaches. UWB radar has been proposed as the active sensor component in an Automatic Target Recognition application, designed to detect humans or objects that have fallen onto subway tracks.

=== Data transfer ===
Ultra-wideband characteristics are well-suited to short-range applications, such as PC peripherals, Wireless monitors, camcorders, wireless printing, and file transfers to portable media players. UWB was proposed for use in personal area networks, and appeared in the IEEE 802.15.3a draft PAN standard. However, after several years of deadlock, the IEEE 802.15.3a task group was dissolved in 2006. The work was completed by the WiMedia Alliance and the USB Implementer Forum. Slow progress in UWB standards development, the cost of initial implementation, and performance significantly lower than initially expected are several reasons for the limited use of UWB in consumer products (which caused several UWB vendors to cease operations in 2008 and 2009).

=== Autonomous vehicles ===
UWB's precise positioning and ranging capabilities enable collision avoidance and centimeter-level localization accuracy, surpassing traditional GPS systems. Moreover, its high data rate and low latency facilitate seamless vehicle-to-vehicle communication, promoting real-time information exchange and coordinated actions. UWB also enables effective vehicle-to-infrastructure communication, integrating with infrastructure elements for optimized behavior based on precise timing and synchronized data. Additionally, UWB's versatility supports innovative applications such as high-resolution radar imaging for advanced driver assistance systems, secure key less entry via biometrics or device pairing, and occupant monitoring systems, potentially enhancing convenience, security, and passenger safety.

== UWB products/chips ==
Supplier	Product name	Standard	Band	Announced	Commercial products
Microchip Technology	ATA8350	LRP	6.2–7.8 GHz	Feb 2021	
Microchip Technology	ATA8352	LRP	6.2–8.3 GHz	Feb 2021	
NXP	NCJ29D5	HRP	6–8.5 GHz	Nov 12, 2019	
NXP	SR100T	HRP	6–9 GHz	Sept 17, 2019	Samsung Galaxy Note20 Ultra
Apple Inc.	U1	HRP	6–8.5 GHz	Sept 11, 2019	iPhone 11, iPhone 12, iPhone 13, and iPhone 14, Apple Watch Series 6, Apple Watch Series 7, Apple Watch Series 8, and Apple Watch Ultra, HomePod Mini and HomePod (2nd generation), AirTag (1st generation), and AirPods Pro 2
Apple Inc.	U2	HRP	6–8.5 GHz	Sept 12, 2023	iPhone 15 and newer (excluding iPhone 16e and iPhone 17e), iPhone Air, Apple Watch Series 9 and newer, Apple Watch Ultra 2 and newer, AirTag (2nd generation), and AirPods Pro 3
Qorvo	DW1000	HRP	3.5–6.5 GHz	Nov 7, 2013	
Qorvo	DW3000	HRP	6–8.5 GHz	Jan 2019	
3dB Access	3DB6830	LRP	6–8 GHz		
Ceva	Ceva-Waves UWB	HRP	3.1–10.6 GHz depending on radio	Jun 24, 2021	
SPARK Microsystems	SR1010/SR1020	N/A	3.1–6 GHz, 6-9.25 GHz	Mar 18, 2020	
Samsung Electronics	Exynos Connect U100	Unknown	6489.6 MHz/ 8987.2 MHz	Mar 21, 2023	

== Regulation ==
In the U.S., ultra-wideband refers to radio technology with a bandwidth exceeding the lesser of 500 MHz or 20% of the arithmetic center frequency, according to the U.S. Federal Communications Commission (FCC). A February 14, 2002 FCC Report and Order authorized the unlicensed use of UWB in the frequency range from 3.1 to 10.6 GHz. The FCC power spectral density (PSD) emission limit for UWB transmitters is −41.3 dBm/MHz. This limit also applies to unintentional emitters in the UWB band (the "Part 15" limit). However, the emission limit for UWB emitters may be significantly lower (as low as −75 dBm/MHz) in other segments of the spectrum.

Deliberations in the International Telecommunication Union Radiocommunication Sector (ITU-R) resulted in a Report and Recommendation on UWB in November 2005. UK regulator Ofcom announced a similar decision on 9 August 2007.

There has been concern over interference between narrowband and UWB signals that share the same spectrum. Earlier, the only radio technology that used pulses was spark-gap transmitters, which international treaties banned because they interfere with medium-wave receivers. However, UWB uses much lower levels of power. The subject was extensively covered in the proceedings that led to the adoption of the FCC rules in the US, and in the meetings of the ITU-R leading to its Report and Recommendations on UWB technology. Commonly-used electrical appliances emit impulsive noise (for example, hair dryers), and proponents successfully argued that the noise floor would not be raised excessively by wider deployment of low power wideband transmitters.

=== Coexistence with other standards ===
In February 2002, the Federal Communications Commission (FCC) released an amendment (Part 15) that specifies the rules of UWB transmission and reception. According to this release, any signal with fractional bandwidth greater than 20% or having a bandwidth greater than 500 MHz is considered as an UWB signal. The FCC ruling also defines access to 7.5 GHz of unlicensed spectrum between 3.1 and 10.6 GHz that is made available for communication and measurement systems.

Narrowband signals that exist in the UWB range, such as IEEE 802.11a transmissions, may exhibit high PSD levels compared to UWB signals as seen by a UWB receiver. As a result, one would expect a degradation of UWB bit error rate performance.

== Technology groups ==
- WiMedia Alliance
- Bluetooth SIG
- Wireless USB
- Wireless Gigabit Alliance
- WirelessHD
- Wireless FireWire
- TransferJet
- FM-UWB
- IEEE 802.15.3
- IEEE 802.15.4
- IEEE 802.15.4a
- IEEE 802.15.4f
- ISO/IEC 24730-61 LRP
- ISO/IEC 24730-62 HRP
- FiRa Consortium
- omlox The Open Locating Standard

== See also ==
- List of UWB channels
- List of UWB-enabled mobile devices
- Narrowband
- Wideband
- Broadband
- NearLink
- Spread spectrum
- Error correction code
- IEEE 802.15.4a
- Modulation methods
  - Orthogonal frequency-division multiplexing (OFDM)
  - Phase-shift keying (PSK)
  - Pulse-position modulation (PPM)
- Wi-Fi Direct
- Energy harvesting
- Spark-gap transmitter
- WiB (digital terrestrial television)
