= T39 =

T39 may refer to:

- Cooper T39, a British sports car
- Ericsson T39, a mobile phone
- Guerchais-Roche T.39 a French touring monoplane
- HMSAS Parktown (T39), a minesweeper of the South African Naval Services
- North American T-39 Sabreliner, an American jet trainer aircraft
