= Rom =

Rom, rom, or ROM may refer to:

== Biomechanics and medicine ==
- Risk of mortality, a medical classification to estimate the likelihood of death for a patient
- Rupture of membranes, a term used during pregnancy to describe a rupture of the amniotic sac

== Computing ==
- Read-only memory, a form of non-volatile memory used in computers and other electronic devices
  - ROM cartridge, a portable form of read-only memory
  - ROM image, a computer file which contains a copy of the data from a read-only memory chip
  - Android ROM, a file containing executable instructions of an Android OS
- ROM (MUD), a popular MUD codebase, in gaming
- Request of maintainer, a request by the maintainer of a software package

== Engineering ==
- Range of motion, the distance that a movable object may normally travel while properly attached to another object e.g., of joints, in physiotherapy
- RFID on metal, radio-frequency identification (RFID) tags, which perform a specific function when attached to metal objects
- Rough order of magnitude, a type of cost estimation

== Arts and entertainment ==
- Ethan Rom, one of the Others in the TV series Lost
- Rom the Space Knight, a Marvel Comics superhero based on the Parker Brothers toy of the same name
- Rom (Star Trek), a Ferengi character in Star Trek: Deep Space Nine
- Rom, a fictional character in Hyperdimension Neptunia Mk2
- Runes of Magic, a popular MMORPG
- Rom, a boss in the videogame Bloodborne
- Read-Only Memory (publisher), a British publisher of art books related to the Britsoft era of video game development
- Rom (album)

== Places and structures ==
- River Rom, England
- Rom (river), Switzerland and Italy
- Rom, Afghanistan, a village in Sar-e Pol province, Afghanistan
- Rom, Deux-Sèvres, a commune in the Deux-Sèvres department in western France
- Rom (Mecklenburg), a community in the district of Parchim, Mecklenburg-Vorpommern, Germany
- Rom, a district of Morsbach in North Rhine-Westphalia, Germany
- Rom, Iran, a village in South Khorasan Province, Iran
- Royal Ontario Museum, a museum in Toronto, Ontario, Canada
- The Rom, a skatepark in Hornchurch, East London, England
- Romania (UNDP code: ROM)

== Society ==
- Rom (watangu walal), a system of customary law of the Yolngu people of Arnhem Land, Australia
  - ROM ceremony, a Yolngu ceremonial practice
- Rom (plural Roma), one of the ethnic designations used by the Romani people
  - Romani language (ISO 639-2 & ISO 639-3 codes: ROM)

== Other uses ==
- Return on margin, a judge of performance based on the net gain or net loss compared to the perceived risk
- Refuel On the Move, a DoD logistic action
- Epistle to the Romans, a book of the Bible, commonly abbreviated to Rom
