= IEEE 1902.1 =

Low frequency wireless data communication protocol, also known as RuBee

The IEEE 1902.1-2009 standard is a wireless data communication protocol also known as RuBee, operates within the Low Frequency radio wave range of 30–900 kHz. Although very resistant to interference, metal, water and obstacles, it is very limited in range, usually only suitable for short-range networks. The baud rate is limited to 1,200 kB/s, (Note: that is, 1024 bits/second) making it a very low-rate communication network as well. This standard is aimed at the conception of wireless network of sensors and actuators in industrial and military environments. One of the major advantage 1902.1 tags is they are extremely low power and last for years on a simple coin size battery and they can be sealed in a MIL STD 810G package. RuBee tags emit virtually no RF and do not produce any Compromising Emanations, as a result are used in high security facilities. RuBee tags are safe and in use near and on high explosive facilities.

The IEEE 1902.1 is an alternative to other higher-power wireless network of sensors and actuators based on the standard IEEE 802.15.4, such as Zigbee and 6LoWPAN. Other concurrent standards also exist: ISO/IEC 18000-7 DASH7, infrared networking and ultra-wide band networking.

IEEE 1902.1 is unique as it uses a very low frequency and magnetic field modulation (created by a magnetic dipole antenna in the near-field) as the physical mean. Due to its low frequency, RuBee has negligible multipath reflections so the signal can be used to geolocate assets. The IEEE Working Group on 1902.1 named itself RuBee, after the gem and insect. RuBee stands in contrast to the well-known network certification Zigbee, a related but completely different networking standard.

== Network devices ==
IEEE 1902.1 supports the design of networks constituted by two devices: Controllers and Responders, based on a simplified IEEE MAC layer. The Controller initiates a command request and the Responder detects the request, processes some functions like measuring pressure, temperature or activating a relay, before sending a Response packet back to the Controller.

Responder devices have four addresses, two of them configurable, and two by fabric design.

== Network Power ==
The maximum power of emission recommended is 10 micro-Watts. This power limits the area of the network to a piconet, between 0.5 metres (1.6 ft) and 30 metres (98 ft).

== Physical layer ==
The physical communication mean used is the inductive coupling signaling working in the near field of a 131 kHz magnetic dipole antenna. Inductive coupling power falls cubically with the distance between the Controller and Responder.

== Modulation ==
The recommended modulations are Amplitude-shift keying (ASK), and Binary Phase Shift Keying (BPSK). The Controller must support both modulations, although the Responder may only support one.

== Encoding ==
On top of the modulation, the IEEE 1902.1 recommends two encoding methods: BMC, Bi-phase Marc Coding, known as a Manchester Encoding technique. This encoding method combined with BPSK is insensitive to a polarity reversal and has a good signal-to-noise ratio.

== Data Protocol ==
IEEE 1902.1 - Protocol States Diagram - free interpretation of the author, not IEEE

The protocol is simple: the Controller originates the signal and sends out a protocol data unit (PDU) to a Responder along with its address and the command to be processed. The Responder sends a PDU back to the Controller in response.

Two types of PDUs are available for use in the protocol: the Request PDU and the Respond PDU. Each support an application protocol that the specific implementation must define. A frame check sequence is responsible for error checking, which, due to the system's simplicity, must be done on the application layer.

The protocol uses heuristics - measures that generally work but do not absolutely guarantee their reception or accuracy - in order to be most efficient. Unlike the Carrier Sense Multiple Access (CSMA) standard there is no anti-collision mechanism; multiple signals are unable to be distinguished by the network if the Controllers and Responders are not completely synchronized.

== Responder States ==
The Controller is considered permanently "Awake" and to have a power supply provided by a permanent source. The Responder is made to work on battery and alternate between "Listening" and "Sleeping" states.

The Responder, in the "Listen" state, tries to detect a carrier at 131 kHz and to read its commands. An emitting Controller in ASK sends a low power carrier for a zero bit whereas in BPSK the carrier is always present at the maximum emitting power. Thus, the Responder can detect the communicating Controller and stay listening. If there are many Responders and if the Controller uses only the one-to-one Request PDU, the Responder will stay listening for all commands sent and received on the network, and therefore may stay permanently awake. The use of responder groups, multicast or broadcast, help to better manage battery life for the Responders. An optimization for the cost and sleeping period of the Request PDUs must be done on the application layer.

== Carrier Power ==
A nice feature proposed in the standard is a frequency available to broadcast energy and supply the Responders. This frequency is 65.536 kHz, about half of the 131 kHz frequency that is used for data communication. The IEEE 1902.1 recommends devices to have an average power of less than 10 milli-Watts (mW). As the medium in an inductive signal, the signal diminishes cubically, so the Responders must sleep quite a long time in order to store enough energy to listen and respond to the Controller requests. It is often desirable for them to charge for periods of time before being used again. Use of a higher wattage is not allowed in Europe.

== Anti-collision mechanisms ==
BMC encoding on BPSK modulation allows synchronizing the listening of the carrier on a specific Responder or Controller signal, rejecting all other signals as noise. The listener device can also have two listening channels with synchronized sampling at 90° (phase quadrature) and help to distinguish even signals with orthogonal interference.

== Volume multiplexing and Clip Mechanism ==
If a network is composed of many Controllers and a large number of Responders, the Controllers' requests are synchronized as well as Responders' responses (the "Clip" mechanism). In the traditional "volume multiplexing" concept, however, the Controllers would be placed nearby their Responders and answer only to the nearest Controller. This "Clip" Controller signal is much better that others at greater distances and filters out more noise.

== Where to use the IEEE 1902.1 standard ==
- This is the lowest power, frequency and rate wireless network available for industrial use. The use of an inductive signal enables the creation of a small piconet for sensors and actuators that become completely insensitive to metal, water and surrounding obstacles, unlike the well known IEEE 802.15.4, on which other standards are based (for example, LRWPAN, the Low Rate Wireless Personal Area Network, like Zigbee, uses the 2.4 GHz frequency that is very sensitive to multipath, radio reflection, obstacles, water, and metals). The baud rate of IEEE 1902.1 is, however, 250 times less than that of IEEE 802.15.4.
- The simplicity of the modulation is due to the lack of components that implement this standard. All must be done with discrete components.
- The distinguishing factor of the IEEE 1902.1 standard:
  «RuBee is the only wireless technology to ever be approved for use in secure facilities by the U.S. Department of Energy (DoE). RuBee has also been approved by DoE and HERO tests by the Department of Defense for use in high explosive areas with a Safe Separation Distance (SSD) and intrinsic safety of zero».
  Explanation: RuBee uses very low frequency modulation and is not so absorbed by matter than more used standards of IEEE 802 like WiFi, Zigbee, Bluetooth. So, RuBee heats less matter. For explosive manufacturing and storage, it should be safer if the comparison uses identical emitting power between compared solutions.
- RuBee "Tags" may be detected with high sensitivity through doors, even if the asset is hidden in a steel briefcase, as well as in vehicles through gates using antennas buried in a road.
- Highly sensitive assets can be secured by Rubee's Tags with the particular advantage that obstacles, conductive barriers, or walls will not create false alarms or diminish the range of detection of the Tag.

== See also ==
- Short-range device
