= BlueBorne (security vulnerability) =

Security vulnerability affecting Bluetooth

BlueBorne is a type of security vulnerability with Bluetooth implementations in Android, iOS, Linux and Windows. It affects many electronic devices such as laptops, smart cars, smartphones and wearable gadgets. One example is CVE-2017-14315. The vulnerabilities were first reported by Armis, the asset intelligence cybersecurity company, on 12 September 2017. According to Armis, "The BlueBorne attack vector can potentially affect all devices with Bluetooth capabilities, estimated at over 8.2 billion devices today [2017]."

== History ==
The BlueBorne security vulnerabilities were first reported by Armis, the asset intelligence cybersecurity company, on 12 September 2017.

== Technical Information ==
The BlueBorne vulnerabilities are a set of 8 separate vulnerabilities. They can be broken down into groups based upon platform and type. There were vulnerabilities found in the Bluetooth code of the Android, iOS, Linux and Windows platforms:

- Linux kernel RCE vulnerability - CVE-2017-1000251
- Linux Bluetooth stack (BlueZ) information Leak vulnerability - CVE-2017-1000250
- Android information Leak vulnerability - CVE-2017-0785
- Android RCE vulnerability #1 - CVE-2017-0781
- Android RCE vulnerability #2 - CVE-2017-0782
- The Bluetooth Pineapple in Android - Logical Flaw CVE-2017-0783
- The Bluetooth Pineapple in Windows - Logical Flaw CVE-2017-8628
- Apple Low Energy Audio Protocol RCE vulnerability - CVE-2017-14315

The vulnerabilities are a mixture of information leak vulnerabilities, remote code execution vulnerability or logical flaw vulnerabilities. The Apple iOS vulnerability was a remote code execution vulnerability due to the implementation of LEAP (Low Energy Audio Protocol). This vulnerability was only present in older versions of the Apple iOS.

== Impact ==
In 2017, BlueBorne was estimated to potentially affect all the 8.2 billion Bluetooth devices worldwide, although they clarify that 5.3 billion Bluetooth devices are at risk. Many devices are affected, including laptops, smart cars, smartphones and wearable gadgets.

In 2018, after one year after the original disclosure, Armis estimated that over 2 billion devices were still vulnerable.

== Mitigation ==
Google provides a BlueBorne vulnerability scanner from Armis for Android. Procedures to help protect devices from the BlueBorne security vulnerabilities were reported by September 2017.
