= Jaap Haartsen =

Dutch electrical engineer

Jacobus "Jaap" Cornelis Haartsen (born 13 February 1963, The Hague, Netherlands) is a Dutch electrical engineer, researcher, inventor and entrepreneur, best known for being credited as the inventor of the short-range wireless communication technology for consumer electronics, known as Bluetooth.

== Education ==
He obtained his Master of Science degree in 1986 in electrical engineering (with honors) at the Delft University of Technology in the Netherlands. After a brief period at Siemens in The Hague and Philips in Eindhoven, he continued his studies and in 1990 obtained a PhD degree from the Delft University of Technology (also with honors) defending the thesis titled Programmable surface acoustic wave detection in silicon: design of programmable filters.

== Career ==
Since 1991, Haartsen worked for Ericsson, first in United States between 1991 and 1993 and later, between 1993 and 1997, in Sweden. While working for Ericsson Mobile Terminal Division in Lund and leading a group of engineers, he developed the specification for Bluetooth. Later, in 1997 he moved to Ericsson division in Emmen. Following his breakthrough at Ericsson, Haartsen served as Chief Technology Officer at Tonalite BV (later acquired by Plantronics). Between 2000 and 2008 he was a part-time professor at University of Twente, teaching mobile radio communications systems. In 2015, he was inducted into the National Inventors Hall of Fame. Currently, he is a partner of an Assen-based consumer electronics company, Dopple.
