= Secure Network =

European IT consulting company

Secure Network S.r.l.
- Company type: Limited company
- Industry: Information Security
- Founded: 2004
- Founder: Alvise Biffi, Stefano Zanero
- Headquarters: Milan, Italy
- Website: www.securenetwork.it

Secure Network is a small offensive security and security research company focusing on Information Security based in Milan, Italy. Besides having notability in Italy, it received international exposure with a research project on Bluetooth security (co-sponsored by F-Secure) codenamed BlueBag, which has been also selected for the Black Hat Briefings conference 2006 in Las Vegas.

In 2009, it also organized SEaCURE.IT, the first international technical security conference ever held in Italy.

Secure Network also offers internet security compliance consulting to private companies.
