= BlueSoleil =

Bluetooth driver

- Developer: IVT Corporation
- Initial release: 1999
- Stable release: 10.0.497.0 (BlueSoleil) 10.2.497.0 (1000Moons) / January 8, 2018; 7 years ago
- Operating system: Windows XP, Windows Vista, Windows 7, Linux, Windows CE, Windows Mobile and Android
- Type: Bluetooth software
- License: Shareware (Android edition is commercial software)
- Website: www.bluesoleil.com

BlueSoleil is a Bluetooth software/driver for Microsoft Windows, Linux and Windows CE. It supports Bluetooth chipsets from CSR, Broadcom, Marvell etc. Bluetooth dongles, PCs, Laptops, PDAs, PNDs and UMPCs are sometimes bundled with a version of this software albeit with limited functionality and OEM licensing. The software is rarely needed on modern computers, as well-functioning Bluetooth drivers for the most widely used Bluetooth chips have been available through Windows Update since Windows Vista.

BlueSoleil is developed by the Chinese firm IVT Corporation and the first version was released in 1999. In China, BlueSoleil is marketed as 1000Moons (千月).

== Features ==
BlueSoleil features the following technologies:

- Voice over IP
- Advanced Audio Distribution Profile (A2DP) and Audio/Video Remote Control Profile (AVRCP)
- Personal Area Network (PAN)
- Basic Imaging Profile (BIP)
- Cordless Telephony Profile (CTP)
- Instant Messaging
- Integration Phone tools as a profile

A demonstration version of BlueSoleil is available, restricting the device after 2MB data transfer, approximately 1.5 minutes of high-quality audio or 2–4 hours of mouse use. The software must be purchased to enable unlimited use.

== Interoperability ==
BlueSoleil has been distributed over 30 million copies. IVT has also established an interoperability testing centre where it has built up a large library of Bluetooth products which are on the market in order to perform interoperability testing.

Various Bluetooth dongles are delivered with an obsolete or demonstration version of Bluesoleil. New versions are available as a standalone purchase from the vendor's website. Regardless of whether the bundled or the standalone version is purchased, the software enforces licensing restrictions which tie it to the address of a specific Bluetooth dongle.

Bluesoleil works with the main Bluetooth Silicon Vendors hardware, such as Accelsemi, Atheros, CSR, Conwise, 3DSP, Broadcom, Intel, Marvell, NSC, RFMD, SiRF as well as baseband IP such as RivieraWaves BT IP.

If there is no Bluetooth dongle attached to the PC the Bluetooth logo will be grey, blue if a dongle is attached, and green when connected to another Bluetooth enabled device.
