= Ericsson T39 =

Mobile phone by Ericsson Mobile Communications

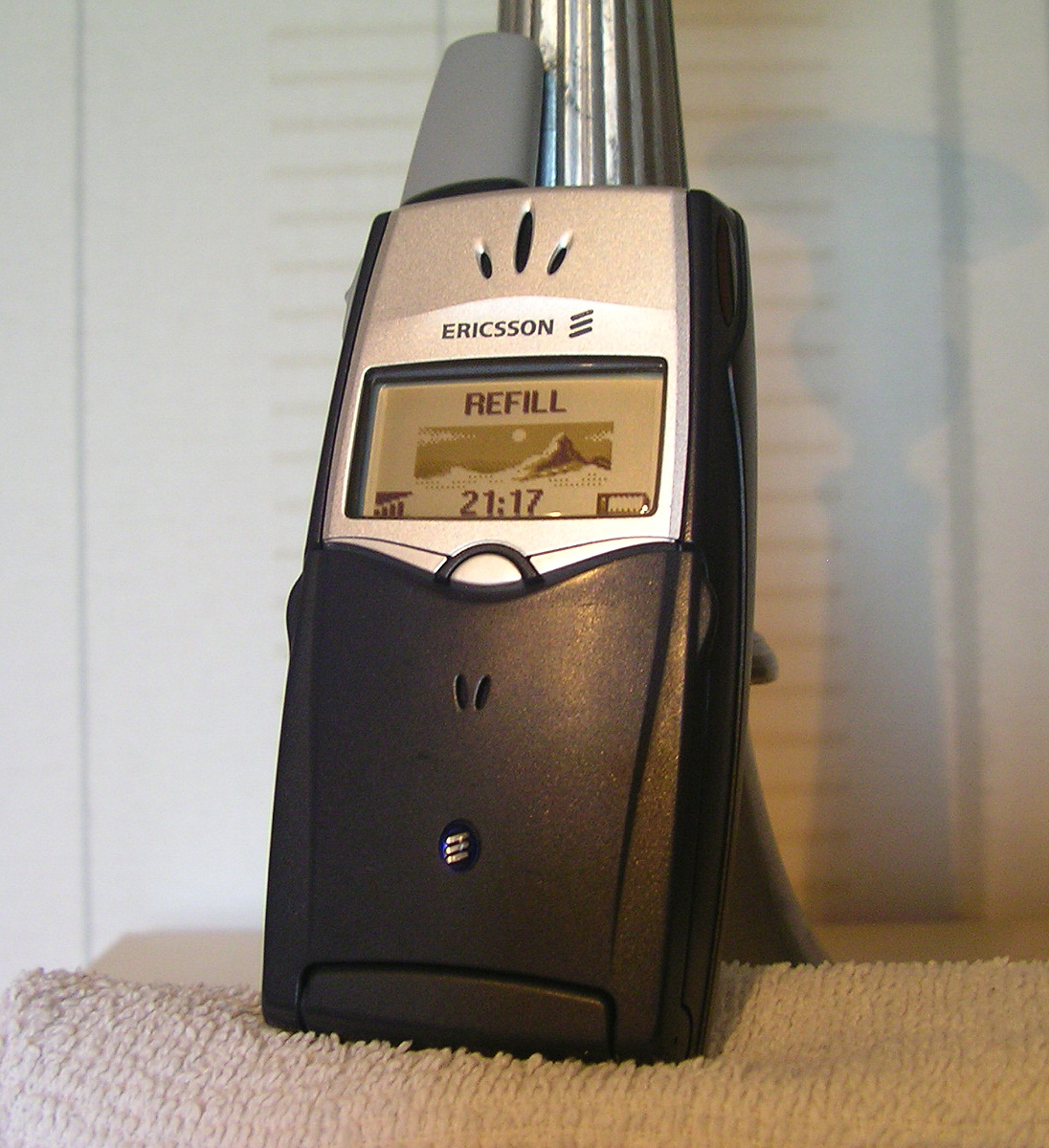
Classic Blue Ericsson T39m

Ericsson T39 was a GSM mobile phone released by Ericsson Mobile Communications in 2001, it was the follow-up to the T28 and T29.

The prototype, which was unveiled in 2000, was the second phone with built-in Bluetooth, while the first was Ericsson R520M.

== Specifications ==
- GSM Tri-band (900/1800/1900)
- Form Factor: Flip
- Weight: 86 g
- Screen: 101 × 54 px Monochrome LCD
- Bluetooth (1.0b)
- IrDA
- SMS, E-mail, WAP 1.2.1, GPRS, HSCSD

The T39 came in three different colour options; Classic Blue which was a dark blue, Icecap Blue which was a light blue, and Rose White which was a cream colour. The T39 was the last phone from Ericsson with an active flip and external antenna.
