= Piconet =

Piconet definition

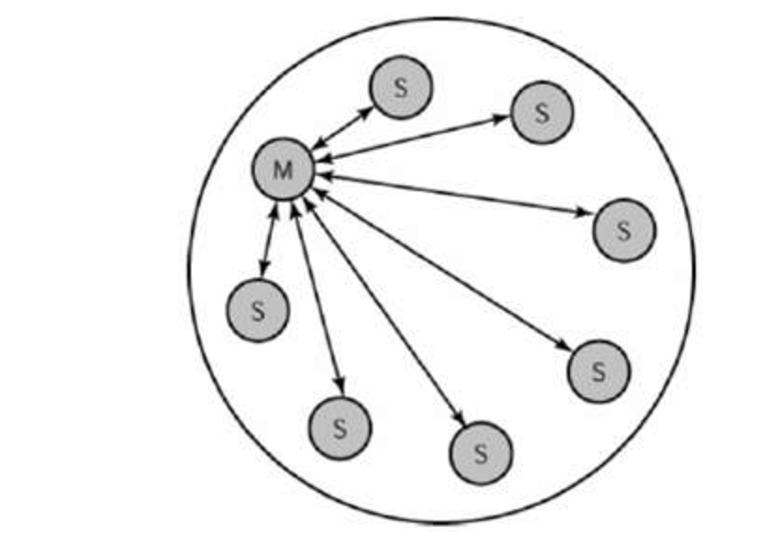
Representation of piconet topology

A piconet is an ad hoc network that links a wireless user group of devices using Bluetooth technology protocols. A piconet consists of two or more devices occupying the same physical channel (synchronized to a common clock and hopping sequence). It allows one master device to interconnect with up to seven active slave devices. Up to 255 further slave devices can be inactive, or parked, which the master device can bring into active status at any time, but an active station must go into parked first.

Some examples of piconets include a cell phone connected to a computer, a laptop and a Bluetooth-enabled digital camera, or several PDAs that are connected to each other.

== Overview ==
A group of devices are connected via Bluetooth technology in an ad hoc fashion. A piconet starts with two connected devices, and may grow to eight connected devices. Bluetooth communication always designates one of the Bluetooth devices as a main controlling unit or master unit. Other devices that follow the master unit are slave units. This allows the Bluetooth system to be non-contention based (no collisions). This means that after a Bluetooth device has been added to the piconet, each device is assigned a specific time period to transmit and they do not collide or overlap with other units operating within the same piconet.

Piconet range varies according to the class of the Bluetooth device. Data transfer rates vary between about 200 and 2100 kilobits per second.

Because the Bluetooth system hops over 79 channels, the probability of interfering with another Bluetooth system is less than 1.5%. This allows several Bluetooth piconets to operate in the same area at the same time with minimal interference.

== See also ==
- Personal area network (PAN)
- Scatternet
- IEEE 802.15
