= RFID on metal =

RFID on metal (abbreviated to ROM) are radio-frequency identification (RFID) tags which perform a specific function when attached to metal objects. The ROM tags overcome some of the problems traditional RFID tags suffer when near metal, such as detuning and reflecting of the RFID signal, which can cause poor tag read range, phantom reads, or no read signal at all.

The RFID-on-metal tags are designed to compensate for the effects of metal. There are several tag design methods to create ROM tags. The original method was to provide a spacer to shield the tag antenna from the metal, creating bigger tags. New techniques focus on specialized antenna design that utilizes the metal interference and signal reflection for longer read range than similar sized tags attached to non-metal objects. RFID-on-metal transponders will continue to create new opportunities for users in a wide range of asset tracking and broader industrial applications. The main applications are asset tracking on servers and laptops in IT data centers, industrial manufacturing quality control and manufacturing, oil and gas pipeline maintenance, and gas cylinders. The technology is evolving to allow transponders to be embedded in metal. The capability allows manufacturers to track small metal items from cradle to grave. The main focus for RFID inside metal is tool tracking, weapon tracking, and medical device quality control.

Inductive-coupling-based systems can transmit through a thin layer of metal, such as a Faraday cage, but thicker layers completely shield the tag—systems around 130 kHz cannot work through aluminum thicker than 0.25 mm or stainless steel thicker than 1.5 mm; lower frequencies can transmit through thicker metal.

RuBee (IEEE 1902.1) on metal

RuBee is a wireless 132 kHz packet-based protocol, with range of few feet to 50 feet, is magnetic and has near zero Radio Frequency (E) energy. RuBee is often used when RF based systems have challenges in harsh environments especially on and near steel and metal. Because it is magnetic it has no multipath reflections so no nulls, and is not blocked by steel, water, snow or dirt. RuBee is in widespread use in industrial environments (over 1,500 sites) on heavy machinery (Injection Molding Machines and Tools), in armories and many defense applications.

== See also ==
- International Organization for Standardization
- Electronic Product Code
