= RuBee =

Wireless protocol

RuBee (IEEE standard 1902.1) is a two-way active Wireless protocol designed for harsh environments and high-security asset visibility applications. RuBee utilizes longwave signals to send and receive short (128 byte) data packets in a local regional network. The protocol is similar to the IEEE 802 protocols in that RuBee is networked by using on-demand, peer-to-peer and active radiating transceivers. RuBee is different in that it uses a low frequency (131 kHz) carrier.

== The IEEE 1902.1 protocol details ==
1902.1 is the "physical layer" workgroup with 17 corporate members. The work group was formed in late 2006. The final specification was issued as an IEEE standard in March 2009. The standard includes such things as packet encoding and addressing specifications. The protocol has already been in commercial use by several companies, in asset visibility systems and networks. However, IEEE 1902.1 will be used in many sensor network applications, requiring this physical layer standard in order to establish interoperability between manufacturers.

A second standard has been drafted 1902.2 for higher level data functions required in Visibility networks. Visibility networks provide the real-time status, pedigree, and location of people, livestock, medical supplies or other high-value assets within a local network. The second standard will address the data-link layers based on existing uses of the RuBee protocol. This standard, which will be essential for the widespread use of RuBee in visibility applications, will support the interoperability of RuBee tags, RuBee chips, RuBee network routers, and other RuBee equipment at the data-link layer.

== RuBee tag details ==
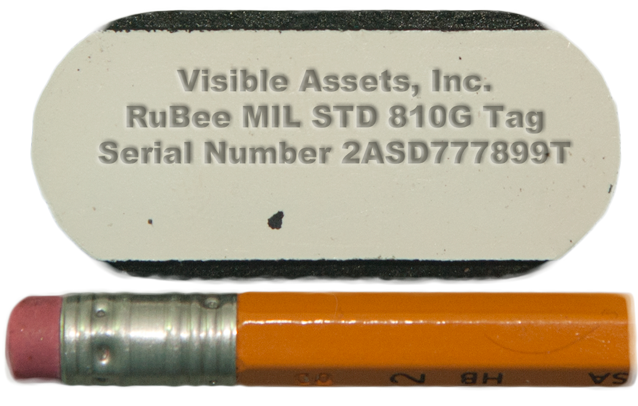
A typical RuBee radio tag, about 1.5 x .75 by 0.07 inches.

A RuBee tag has a 4 bit CPU, 1 to 5 kB of sRAM, a crystal, and a lithium battery with an expected life of ten years.

It can optionally have sensors, displays, and buttons. The RuBee protocol is bidirectional, on-demand, and peer-to-peer. It can operate at other frequencies (e.g. 450 kHz) but 131 kHz is the most widely used one. The RuBee protocol uses an IP Address (Internet Protocol Address). A tag may hold data in its own memory (instead or in addition to having data stored on a server). RuBee functions successfully in harsh environments (one or both ends of the communication are near steel or water), with networks consisting of many thousands of tags, and has a range of 1 to 30 m (3 to 100 ft) depending on the antenna configuration. This allows RuBee radio tags function in environments where other radio tags and RFID may have problems.

RuBee networks are in use in many visibility applications, including exit-entry detection in high-security government facilities, weapons and small arms in high-security armories, mission-critical specialized tools, smart shelves and racks for high-value assets; and smart entry/exit portals.

== RuBee disadvantages and advantages ==
The major disadvantage RuBee has over other protocols is speed and packet size. The RuBee protocol is limited to 1,200 baud in existing applications. The IEEE 1902.1 specifies 1,200 baud. The protocol could go to 9,600 baud with some loss of range. However, most visibility applications work well at 1,200 baud. Packet size is limited to tens to hundreds of bytes. RuBee's design forgoes high bandwidth, and high-speed communication because most visibility applications do not require them.

The use of LW magnetic energy brings about a number of advantages:

- Long battery life – Because of the use of low frequencies and data rates, the chips and detectors can run at low speeds. Using (lowest cost) 4 micrometer CMOS chip technology leads to extremely low power consumption. LW magnetic wave tag systems can achieve 5 to 25 year lives using low-cost lithium batteries. This is also the expected battery shelf life.
- Tag data travels with the asset – Because data is stored in the tag, IT (Information Technology) costs are reduced. This means that with a low-cost handheld reader, one can read a RuBee tag and learn about the asset — manufacturing date, expiry date, lot number, etc. — without having to go to an IT system to look it up. In addition, the distance between the reader and the asset is not critical. RuBee can also write to a tag at the same range as it can read it. RFID, on the other hand, uses EEPROM memory, and writing to the tag is awkward. (In the case of RFID, the range is limited, more power is required and writes times are long.)
- Human-safe – A RuBee base station produces only nanowatts of radio energy. RuBee's LW magnetic waves are not absorbed by biological tissues and are not regulated by OSHA. In fact, RuBee produces less power and lower field strengths than the metal detectors in airports and the anti-theft detectors in retail stores operating at similar frequencies — by a factor of about 10 to 100. Recently published studies show that RuBee has no effect on pacemakers or other implantable devices (Hayes et al., 2007).
- Intrinsically safe – A RuBee base station and tag produce a low level of magnetic energy not capable of heating explosives or creating a spark. In independent studies carried out by the Department of Energy RuBee was given a Safe Separation Distance (SSD) of zero, and is the only wireless technology to have that rating. That means tags and base stations can be placed directly on high explosives with no risk of accidental ignition or any heating.
- High security and privacy RuBee tags have many unique advantages in high security applications. The eavesdropping range (the range at which a person with unlimited funds can listen to tag conversations) is the same as the tag range. That means if someone is listening, they must be close enough for you to be able to see them. This is not true for RFID or 802 protocols. That means no one can secretly listen to tag/base station conversations. In addition, since RuBee tags have a battery, a crystal, and sRAM memory, they can use strong encryption with nearly uncrackable one-time keys, or totally uncrackable one-time pads. RuBee is in use today in many high-security applications for these reasons. RuBee is the only wireless technology approved for use in secure US government sites.
- Controlled volumetric range – RuBee has a maximum volumetric range of approximately 10,000 square feet (900 m²), using volumetric loop antennas — From even a small volumetric antenna of 1 sq ft (900 cm²), RuBee can read a tag within an egg-shaped (ellipsoid) volume of about 10 x 10 x 15 ft (3 x 3 x 5 m). A special feature of IEEE P1902.1 known as Clip makes it possible to place many adjacent loop antennas in an antenna farm, and read from tens to hundreds of base stations simultaneously.
- Cost effective - With RuBee, relatively simple base stations and routers can be employed, which means receivers and card readers can be reasonably priced as compared to higher frequency transceivers. In addition, the tags often include a single chip, a battery, a crystal, and an antenna, and can be priced competitively with respect to active RFID tags (those including a battery).
- Less noise – Because ambient noise in a region falls off as 1/r³, RuBee exhibits reduced susceptibility to extraneous noise. The major limit to antenna size is deep space noise.
- Readable from inside a Faraday cage RF blocker, unlike higher-frequency far-field RFID tags and most RFID on metal tags.

== Compare to NFC and Qi inductive power transfer ==
This protocol is similar at the physical level to NFC (13.56 MHz carrier, basically an air-core transformer pair) and also Qi's inductive energy transfer (100 kHz – 300 kHz carrier). Both modulate the receiver's coil load to communicate with the sender. Some NFC tags can support simple processors and a handful of storage like this protocol. NFC also shares the physical security properties of "magnetic" communications like RuBee, however, NFC signals can be detected miles from the source. RuBee signals are detectable at a maximum distance of 20 metres (66 ft) from the source.
