= Stonestreet One =

Stonestreet One, LLC
- Industry: Wireless (Bluetooth) Software
- Founded: 1999
- Headquarters: Louisville, Kentucky
- Key people: Tim Reilly, President; Robert Saunders, Chairman
- Website: www.stonestreetone.com

Stonestreet One was a software company specializing in Bluetooth software solutions. Founded in 1999 in Louisville, Kentucky, Stonestreet One created and sold software for the Bluetooth wireless technology industry. They specialized in solutions for chipmakers, distributors, embedded software companies and Original Equipment Manufacturers. Stonestreet One was acquired by Qualcomm in 2014.

Bluetopia, the company's core product, was their implementation of the upper layers of the Bluetooth protocol stack. Bluetopia was first qualified by the Bluetooth Special Interest Group in 2000 and since had been used by Original Equipment Manufacturers (OEMs) and Original Design Manufacturers (ODMs) around the world in personal computing, automotive, biomedical, mobile communications and consumer electronics products. Customers included Motorola, Garmin, Kodak, and Honeywell, among others. Bluetopia + LE was a newer version of the software that ran specifically for Bluetooth low energy technology.

As of 2009, Stonestreet One was an Associate member of the Bluetooth SIG. In addition, the company's President Tim Reilly was a member of the Bluetooth SIG Ecosystem Committee; an advisory body set up to provide insight on the future direction of the wireless connectivity market. In 2009, Stonestreet One was a featured company in Enterprise Corp's Hot Dozen Showcase.

== Products ==
=== Bluetopia ===
Bluetopia was Stonestreet One's Bluetooth stack. Bluetopia's Application Programming Interface provided access to the upper-layer protocols and profiles described below among others and can interface directly to a variety of Bluetooth chips.

Supported Bluetooth protocols:

- Host Controller Interface (HCI), Logical Link Control and Adaptation Protocol (L2CAP), Service Discovery Protocol (SDP), RFCOMM, Audio/Video Distribution Transport Protocol (AVDTP), Audio/Video Control Transport Protocol (AVCTP), Bluetooth Network Encapsulation Protocol (BNEP), Object Exchange Protocol (OBEX)

Supported Bluetooth profiles:

- Generic Access Profile (GAP), Serial Port Profile (SPP), FAX Profile (FAX), Dial Up Networking Profile (DUN), Generic Object Exchange Profile (GOEP), OBEX Object Push Profile (OPP), OBEX File Transfer Profile (FTP), Headset Profile (HSP), Hands Free Profile (HFP), Hardcopy Cable Replacement Profile (HCRP), Human Interface Device Profile (HID), Synchronization Profile (SYNCH), SIM Access Profile (SAP), Generic Audio/Video Distribution Profile (GAVDP), Advanced Audio Distribution Profile (A2DP), Basic Imaging Profile (BIP)

=== Bluetopia + LE ===
Bluetopia+LE was a Bluetooth protocol stack that comprised two distinct offerings to support Dual Mode and Single Mode Bluetooth devices. Dual Mode Bluetooth devices incorporated BR/EDR and low energy Bluetooth support in the same chipset. Bluetopia +LE Dual combined the standard Bluetopia protocol stack with the additional support for Bluetooth low energy. Single Mode Bluetooth devices supported only Bluetooth low energy. Bluetopia+LE Single was a protocol stack that provided support for single mode devices only. It was based on a legacy version of Bluetopia but had been condensed to fulfill tighter memory obligations.

=== BTExplorer ===
BTExplorer was a user-friendly application that was used to connect and manage multiple Bluetooth-enabled devices. The application worked with Windows Mobile & Windows CE as well as Bluetooth 2.1 + EDR

== See also ==
- List of Bluetooth protocols
- List of Bluetooth profiles
