= Novero =

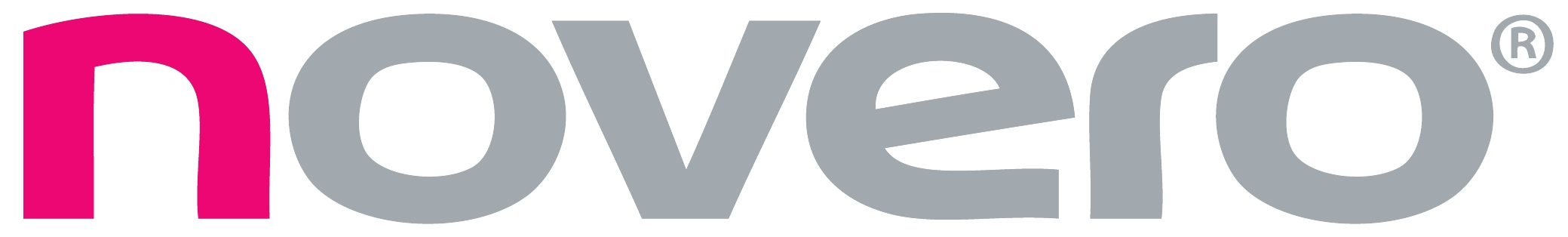
- Company type: Private
- Industry: Telematics
- Founded: 2008
- Founder: Razvan Olosu
- Headquarters: Düsseldorf, Germany
- Key people: Freddie Geier: Managing Director
- Products: Wireless Charging; Antenna coupling Vehicle Tracking System; Remote Vehicle Control
- Website: www.novero.com

Novero is a company making Telematics products for automotive clients. Novero has customers including Audi, Bentley, BMW, Ford of Europe, Jaguar, Land Rover, Mercedes-Benz, Volkswagen, and others.

Founded in 2008 by Romanian entrepreneur Razvan Olosu, via a management buyout of Nokia’s Automotive Group, Novero is headquartered in Düsseldorf, Germany with a main R&D center in Bochum and other business units in Toronto and Dabendorf.

Originally, Novero had both consumer products and automotive products in its portfolio. Since the management change in November 2013, Novero is solely focusing on the Automotive Business.

In November 2012, Novero acquired Funkwerk Dabendorf, a former company from the Funkwerk AG. Funkwerk Dabendorf was first re-branded to novero Dabendorf and later – after the corporate identity change in 2013 – simply to Novero. The Dabendorf business unit is specialized in wireless charging, antenna coupling, Near Field Communication and is well known for the Compenser technology.

== Company timeline ==
- June 2008 – Management buyout from Nokia completed
- June 2008 – Novero founded
- Nov 2012 – Funkwerk Dabendorf acquired
- Nov 2013 – New parent company
- Novero is permanently closed
