= IrMC =

IrMC or Infrared Mobile Communications was an early infrared synchronisation standard for mobile devices that was created and/or pioneered by Ericsson.

According to IrDA, it defines easy exchange of business cards, notes, calendar items and to do lists between mobile devices. It also defines call control and audio transfer between a mobile phone and Notebook PC.

== Status ==
The small number of websites referencing the standard suggests that it seems to be largely obsolete today, as with the concept of infra red synchronisation in general.

== See also ==
- Infrared
- vCard
- IrDA
