= Open Interface North America =

Software provider

Open Interface North America, Inc.
- Type: Private
- Industry: Bluetooth
- Founded: 2000
- Headquarters: Seattle, Washington, USA
- Website: www.oi-us.com (archived)

Open Interface North America (OINA) was a privately owned embedded Bluetooth software provider based in Seattle, Washington and was incorporated in 2000 as a division of the Japanese company Open Interface, Inc., which had formed in 1992. Akemi Sagawa, a Microsoft product manager at the time, was hired to run it. Another former Microsoft employee, Greg Burns, was brought in as chief technology officer.

OINA created and sold Bluetooth software stack products to chip companies with a focus on mobile devices; OINA products were included in Apple’s iPhone, Motorola’s Razr LG’s Chocolate music phone, and Logitech's FreePulse headphones. The Logitech deal was based on OINA's product, SOUNDabout Lossless, a lossless audio codec for bluetooth; SOUNDabout had very little lag and high fidelity, supported multi-channel streaming, and allowed headphone manufacturers to avoid decoding MP3 or AAC, which would have required them to pay royalties on those decompression software packages.

In 2004, OINA had a change in ownership. According to Dashlight Systems, which was founded by Tom Nault in 2003 to develop Bluetooth technology and intellectual property, Dashlight acquired a controlling interest in OINA in May 2004 and Nault became Chairman of the Board of OINA at that time.

Nault became CEO in April 2006 and Sagawa became the company president.

OINA was acquired by Qualcomm in December 2007 under an agreement signed by OINA, Qualcomm, Osprey Acquisition Corporation, and Dashlight; the deal terms were not disclosed.
