= IrDA =

Short-range wireless standard

- Logo of the Infrared Data Association
- Developed by: Infrared Data Association
- Introduced: June 1994 (32 years ago)
- Industry: Personal area networks
- In practice between 5 cm (2.0 in) and 60 cm (24 in)
- Website: irda.org

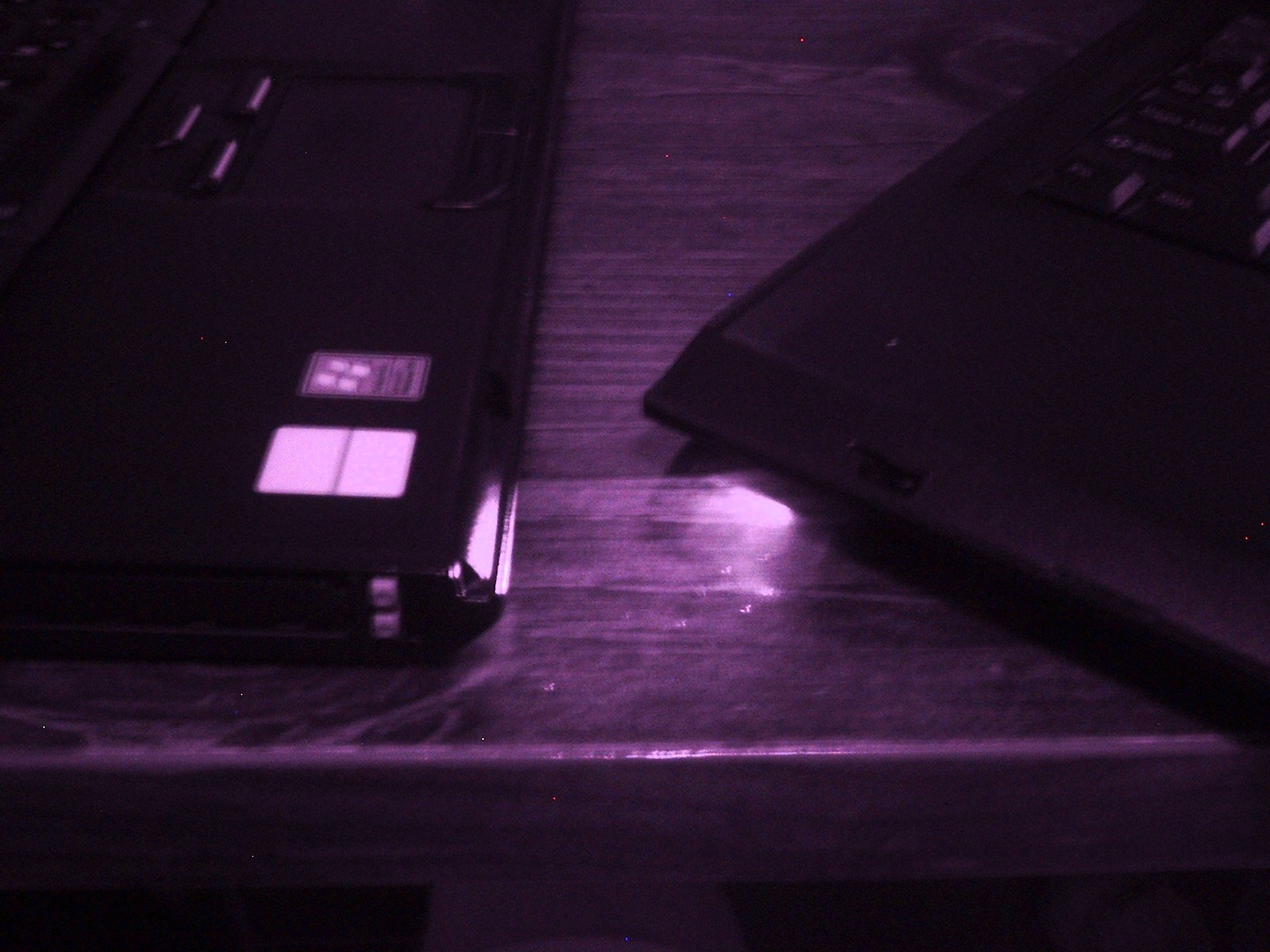
An IrDA data transfer in action between two laptops (transmitter on the right, receiver on the left), captured using an infrared camera

IrDA is a wireless standard designed for data transmission using infrared (IR). Infrared ports for this purpose have been implemented in portable electronic devices such as mobile telephones, laptops, cameras, printers, and medical devices. The main characteristics of this kind of wireless optical communication are short-range bidirectional data transfer, at serial cable speeds, with a line-of-sight using point-and-shoot principles. IrDA has been made dormant by newer improved technologies like Bluetooth. It was popular on PDAs, laptops and some desktops from the late 1990s through the early 2000s. The IrDA specifications include mandatory layers such as IrPHY, IrLAP, and IrLMP.

== History ==
IrDA-Data versions (up to 1.4)
	Communication distance	
	30 cm (12 in) (20 cm low power option)	1 m (3.3 ft)
SIR (Serial/Slow/Standard IR): (Note: In recent revisions of the standard, the term Serial Infrared refers to the physical layer regardless of the actual data rate, modulation, and coding scheme. Previsously the term Serial Infrared (SIR) referred to the 2.4–115.2 kbit/s scheme.) 115 kbit/s	IrDA 1.2	IrDA 1.0
MIR (Medium Speed IR): 1 Mbit/s	IrDA 1.3	IrDA 1.1
FIR (Fast IR): 4 Mbit/s	IrDA 1.3	IrDA 1.1
VFIR (Very Fast IR): 16 Mbit/s	-	IrDA 1.4

The protocols and specifications of the standard were developed by the Infrared Data Association (abbreviated IrDA, giving the name to the standard itself), an industry-driven interest group that was founded in 1993 by around 50 companies. Before IrDA, a number of proprietary standards existed for data exchange using infrared beams but the new association aimed to create an industry standard. The IrDA specifications were published in June 1994. In November 1995, Microsoft announced that it will support in Windows 95. The majority of PCs shipped in 1996 included an infrared port to utilize IrDA connectivity and the same year the first digital camera (Sony DSC-F1) was released for infrared connectivity with a PC or printer.

The Infrared Data Association released the IrDA 1.0 specification in June 1994. In October 1995, IrDA 1.1 was specified that included improved theoretical data transmission speeds. IrDA 1.2 was approved in October 1997 designed to be low power, reducing costs. Version 1.3 was released in 1998 and the IrDA 1.4 implementation was released in 2001.

Development of the standard slowed because of the competing radio wave based Bluetooth standard. Between 2000 and 2002 several members of the Infrared Data Association, including Apple, IBM and Nokia, left the organisation and had joined the Bluetooth Special Interest Group. However the organisation continued to build on the technology and published the Ultra Fast (UFIR) IrDA standard in 2006 with a net data rate of 96 Mbps. In 2009, the Infrared Data Association (IrDA) published Giga-IR which aims for data speeds of 512 Mbps or 1 Gbps.

The association also adopted new standard called IrSimple in August 2005. The development of IrSimple is credited to NTT Docomo, Sharp, ITX E-globaledge and Waseda University. IrSimple provides significantly faster data transmission but maintains backward compatibility with the existing IrDA-enabled protocols. The IrSimple protocols provide sub-1-second transfers of pictures between cell phones, printers, and display devices. For example, some Pentax DSLRs (K-x, K-r) incorporated IrSimple for image transfer and gaming.

== Usage ==
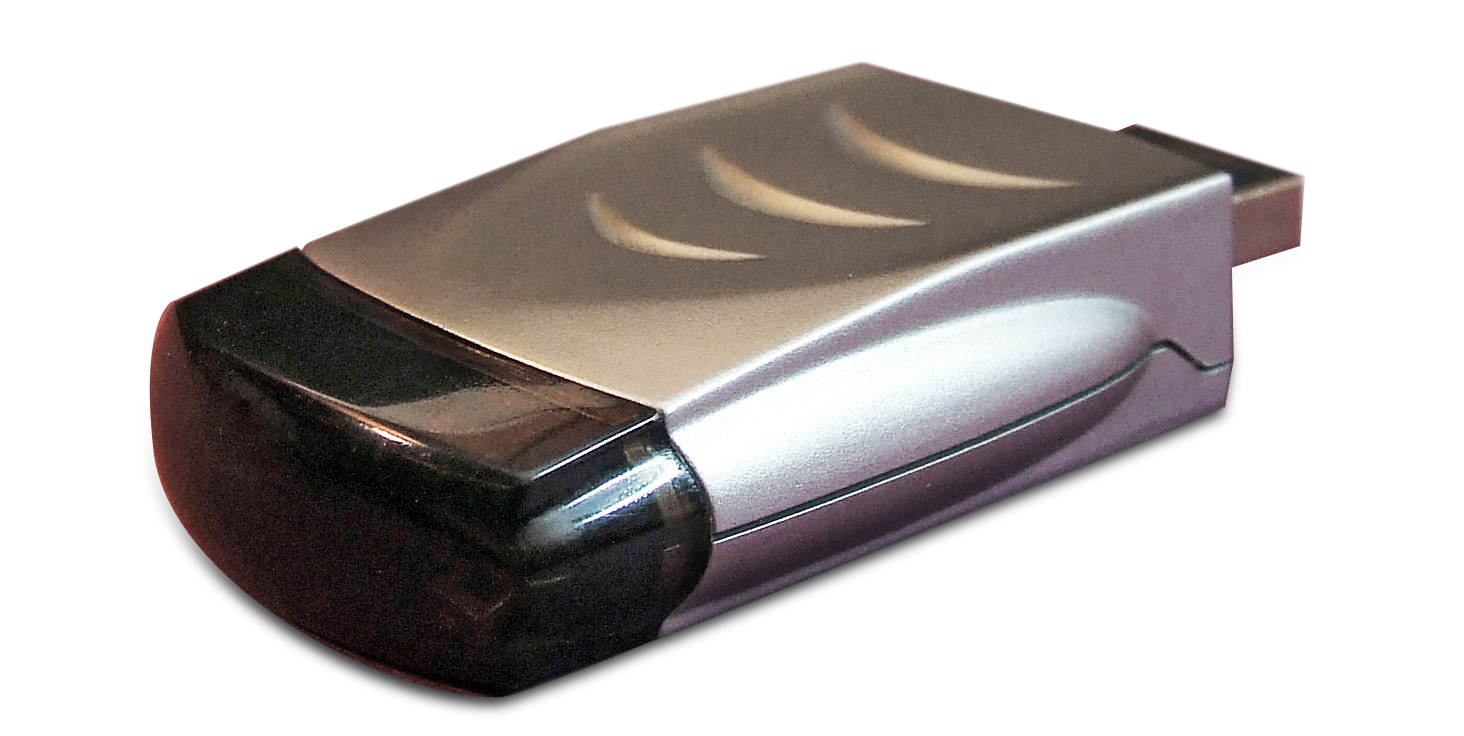
An IrDA USB adapter for use with a computer

IrDA was popular on PDAs, laptops and some desktops from the late 1990s through the early 2000s. It was a cable-free means of transferring files, printing, or tethering.

However, IrDA has been displaced by other wireless technologies such as Bluetooth, and Wi-Fi, favored because they don't need a direct line of sight and can therefore support hardware like mice and keyboards. However, for some time IrDA hardware was still less expensive and did not share the same security problems encountered with the likes of Bluetooth. It is still used in some environments where interference makes radio-based wireless technologies unusable.

== Technical specifications ==
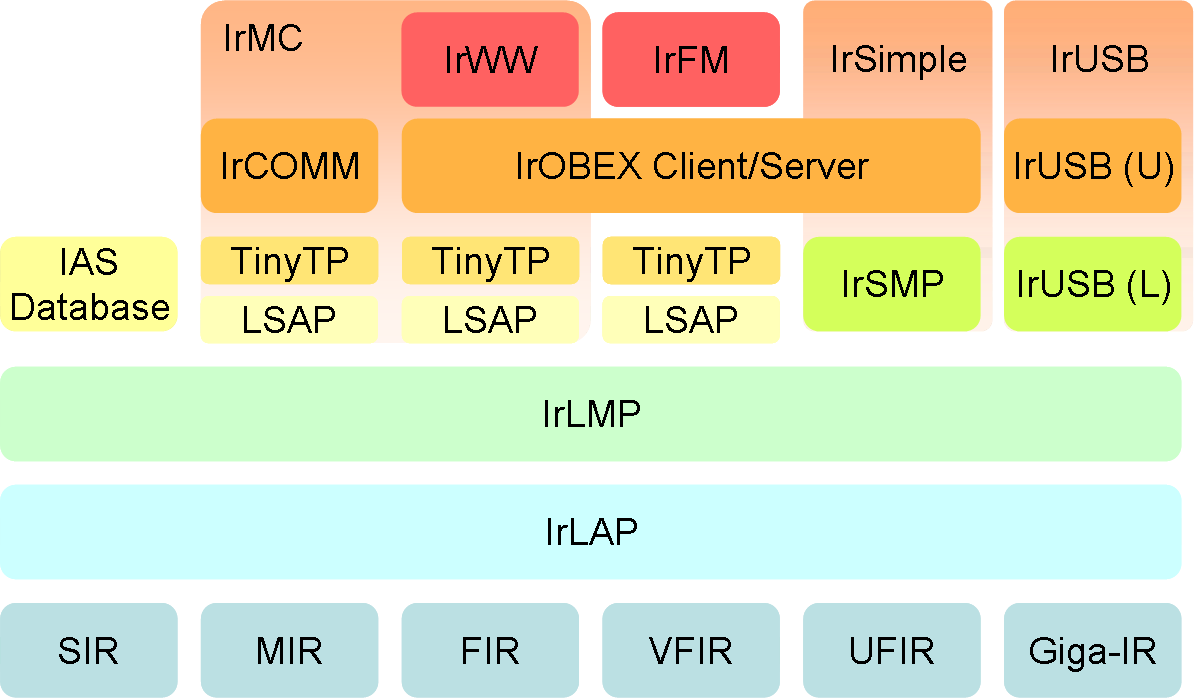
IrDA protocol stack

=== IrPHY ===
The mandatory IrPHY (Serial Infrared Physical Layer Specification) is the physical layer of the IrDA specifications. It comprises optical link definitions, modulation, coding, cyclic redundancy check (CRC) and the framer. Different data rates use different modulation/coding schemes:

- 2.4–115.2 kbit/s (formerly Serial Infrared, SIR): asynchronous, RZI, UART-like, 3/16 pulse. To save energy, the pulse width is often minimized to 3/16 of a 115.2KBAUD pulse width.
- 0.576–1.152 Mbit/s (formerly Medium Infrared, MIR): RZI, 1/4 pulse, HDLC bit stuffing
- 4 Mbit/s (formerly Fast Infrared, FIR): 4PPM
- 16 Mbit/s (formerly Very Fast Infrared, VFIR): NRZ, HHH(1,13)
- 96 Mbit/s (UFIR): NRZI, 8b/10b
- 512 Mbit/s – 1 Gbit/s (GigaIR): NRZI, 2-ASK, 4-ASK, 8b/10b

Further characteristics are:

- Range:
  - standard: 2 m;
  - low-power to low-power: 0.2 m;
  - standard to low-power: 0.3 m.
  - The 10 GigaIR also define new usage models that supports higher link distances up to several meters.
- Angle: minimum cone ±15°
- Speed: 2.4 kbit/s to 1 Gbit/s
- Modulation: baseband, no carrier
- Infrared window (part of the device body transparent to infrared light beam)
- Wavelength: 850–900 nm

The frame size depends on the data rate mostly and varies between 64 B and 64 kB. Additionally, bigger blocks of data can be transferred by sending multiple frames consecutively. This can be adjusted with a parameter called "window size" (1–127). Finally, data blocks up to 8 MB can be sent at once. Combined with a low bit error rate of generally <10^{−9}, that communication could be very efficient compared to other wireless solutions.

IrDA transceivers communicate with infrared pulses (samples) in a cone that extends at least 15 degrees half angle off center. The IrDA physical specifications require the lower and upper limits of irradiance such that a signal is visible up to one meter away, but a receiver is not overwhelmed with brightness when a device comes close. In practice, there are some devices on the market that do not reach one meter, while other devices may reach up to several meters. There are also devices that do not tolerate extreme closeness. The typical sweet spot for IrDA communications is from 5 to 60 cm (2.0 to 23.6 in) away from a transceiver, in the center of the cone. IrDA data communications operate in half-duplex mode because while transmitting, a device's receiver is blinded by the light of its own transmitter, and thus full-duplex communication is not feasible. The two devices that communicate simulate full-duplex communication by quickly turning the link around. The primary device controls the timing of the link, but both sides are bound to certain hard constraints and are encouraged to turn the link around as fast as possible.

=== IrLAP ===
The mandatory IrLAP (Infrared Link Access Protocol) is the second layer of the IrDA specifications. It lies on top of the IrPHY layer and below the IrLMP layer. It represents the data link layer of the OSI model.

The most important specifications are:

- Access control
- Discovery of potential communication partners
- Establishing of a reliable bidirectional connection
- Distribution of the primary/secondary device roles
- Negotiation of QoS parameters

On the IrLAP layer the communicating devices are divided into a "primary device" and one or more "secondary devices". The primary device controls the secondary devices. Only if the primary device requests a secondary device to send, is it allowed to do so.

=== IrLMP ===
The mandatory IrLMP (Infrared Link Management Protocol) is the third layer of the IrDA specifications. It can be broken down into two parts. First, the LM-MUX (Link Management Multiplexer), which lies on top of the IrLAP layer. Its most important achievements are:

- Provides multiple logical channels
- Allows change of primary/secondary devices

Second, the LM-IAS (Link Management Information Access Service), which provides a list, where service providers can register their services so other devices can access these services by querying the LM-IAS.

=== Tiny TP ===
The optional Tiny TP (Tiny Transport Protocol) lies on top of the IrLMP layer. It provides:

- Transportation of large messages by SAR (Segmentation and Reassembly)
- Flow control by giving credits to every logical channel

=== IrCOMM ===
The optional IrCOMM (Infrared Communications Protocol) lets the infrared device act like either a serial or parallel port. It lies on top of the IrLMP layer.

=== OBEX ===
The optional OBEX (Object Exchange) provides the exchange of arbitrary data objects (e.g., vCard, vCalendar or even applications) between infrared devices. It lies on top of the Tiny TP protocol, so Tiny TP is mandatory for OBEX to work.

=== IrLAN ===
The optional IrLAN (Infrared Local Area Network) provides the possibility to connect an infrared device to a local area network. There are three possible methods:

- Access point
- Peer-to-peer
- Hosted

As IrLAN lies on top of the Tiny TP protocol, the Tiny TP protocol must be implemented for IrLAN to work.

=== IrSimple ===
IrSimple achieves at least four to ten times faster data transmission speeds by improving the efficiency of the infrared IrDA protocol. A 500 KB normal picture from a cell phone can be transferred within one second.

=== IrSimpleShot ===
One of the primary targets of IrSimpleShot (IrSS) is to allow the millions of IrDA-enabled camera phones to wirelessly transfer pictures to printers, printer kiosks and flat-panel TVs.

=== Infrared Financial Messaging ===
Infrared Financial Messaging (IrFM) is a wireless payment standard developed by the Infrared Data Association. It was thought to be logical because of the excellent privacy of IrDA, which does not pass through walls.

=== Power meters ===
Many modern (2021) implementations are used for semi-automated reading of power meters. This high-volume application is keeping IrDA transceivers in production. Lacking specialized electronics, many power meter implementations utilize a bit-banged SIR phy, running at 9600 BAUD using a minimum-width pulse (i.e. 3/16 of a 115.2KBAUD pulse) to save energy. To drive the LED, a computer-controlled pin is turned on and off at the right time. Cross-talk from the LED to the receiving PIN diode is extreme, so the protocol is half-duplex. To receive, an external interrupt bit is started by the start bit, then polled a half-bit time after following bits. A timer interrupt is often used to free the CPU between pulses. Power meters' higher protocol levels abandon IrDA standards, typically using DLMS/COSEM instead. With IrDA transceivers (a package combining an IR LED and PIN diode), even this crude IrDA SIR is extremely resistant to external optical noise from incandescents, sunlight, etc.

== See also ==
- Consumer IR
- Li-Fi
- List of device bandwidths
- RZI
