= Bluetooth Special Interest Group =

Standards organization for Bluetooth technologies

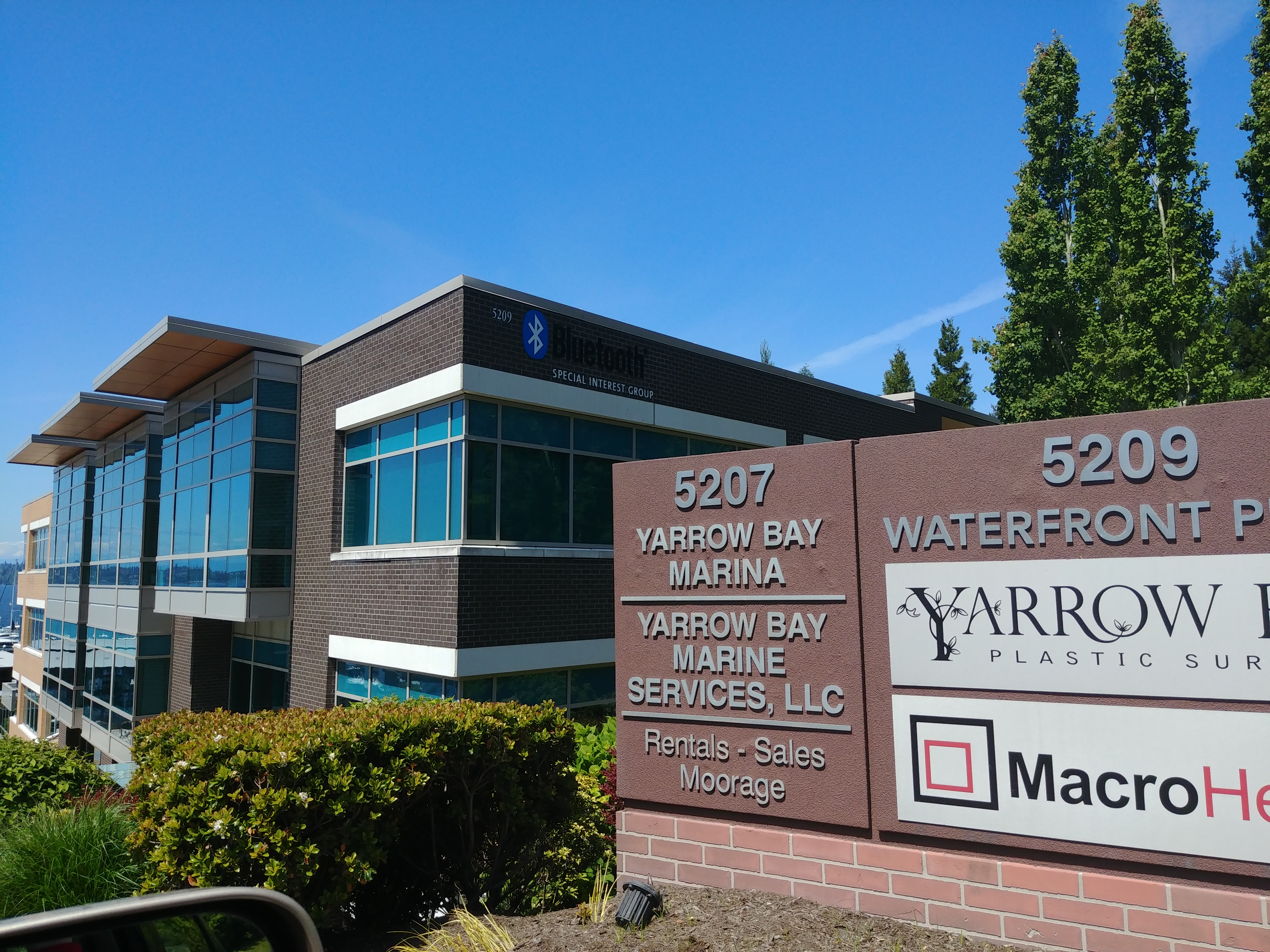
- The Bluetooth SIG headquarters in Kirkland, Washington
- Abbreviation: SIG
- Formation: September 1998; 28 years ago
- Type: Standards organization
- Legal status: Active
- Location: Kirkland, Washington, U.S.
- Coordinates: 47.6540°N 122.2050°W
- Region served: Worldwide
- Official language: English
- Website: www.bluetooth.com

The Bluetooth Special Interest Group (Bluetooth SIG) is the standards organization that oversees the development of Bluetooth standards and the licensing of the Bluetooth technologies and trademarks to manufacturers. The SIG is a not-for-profit, non-stock corporation founded in September 1998. The SIG is headquartered in Kirkland, Washington, US.

The SIG does not make, manufacture or sell Bluetooth-enabled products.

== Introduction ==
Bluetooth technology provides a way to exchange information between Wireless devices such as smartphones, laptops, computers, printers and digital cameras via a secure, low-cost, globally available short-range radio frequency band. Originally developed by Ericsson, Bluetooth technology is now used in many different products by many different manufacturers. These manufacturers must be either Associate or Promoter members of (see below) the Bluetooth SIG before they are granted early access to the Bluetooth specifications, but published Bluetooth specifications are available online via the Bluetooth SIG Website bluetooth.com.

The SIG owns the Bluetooth word mark, figure mark and combination mark. These trademarks are licensed out for use to companies that are incorporating Bluetooth wireless technology into their products. To become a licensee, a company must become a member of the Bluetooth SIG. The SIG also manages the Bluetooth SIG Qualification program, a certification process required for any product using Bluetooth wireless technology and a pre-condition of the intellectual property license for Bluetooth technology. The main tasks for the SIG are to publish the Bluetooth specifications, protect the Bluetooth trademarks and evangelize Bluetooth wireless technology. In 2016, the SIG introduced a new visual and creative identity to support Bluetooth technology as the catalyst for the Internet of Things (IoT). This change included an updated logo, a new tagline and deprecation of the Bluetooth Smart and Bluetooth Smart Ready logos.

At its inception in 1998, the Bluetooth SIG was primarily run by a staff effectively seconded from its member companies. In 2001 Tom Siep served as the group's managing director, and from 2002 to 2004 Mike McCamon led the group as its executive director. In 2004 he was replaced by Michael W. Foley (Mike). From 2012-mid-2024, Mark Powell acted as the Bluetooth SIG's CEO/Executive Director. Effective 29 May 2024, Neville Meijers became the SIG's CEO. Beginning in 2002 a professional staff was hired, composed of operations, engineering and marketing specialists. From 2002 to 2004 the Bluetooth SIG was based in Overland Park, Kansas, US, and is now based in Kirkland, Washington. In addition to its professional staff, the SIG is supported by its more than 40,000 member companies who participate in the various working groups that produce the standardization documents and oversee the qualification process for new products and help to evangelize the technology.

== Structure ==
The SIG members participate in study groups, expert groups, working groups along with committees.

=== Study groups ===
The study groups carry out research into their various areas which informs the development of the Bluetooth specifications. They may eventually become working groups in their own right.

=== Expert groups ===
The expert groups deal with issues of technical importance to all aspects of Bluetooth development. As with the Study Groups their work informs the working groups as well as the corporate groups. Participation in the Expert Groups is restricted to Promoter members and Associate members.

=== Working groups ===
The working groups develop new Bluetooth specifications and enhance adopted specifications. They are responsible for the vast majority of published standards and specifications. Participation in the working groups is restricted to Promoter members and Associate members.

=== Committees ===
The committees of the SIG deal with the other aspects of licensing, marketing and review including developing and maintaining the Qualification Process, oversight of the Bluetooth specifications, and developing, improving and maintaining the test methodology and concepts as well as other strategic functions.

== Membership ==
Any company incorporating Bluetooth wireless technology into products, using the technology to offer goods and services or simply re-branding a product with Bluetooth technology may become a member of the Bluetooth SIG. There are three levels of corporate membership totaling more than 20,000 members, and individuals from member companies may also participate.

=== Promoter members ===
These members are the most active in the SIG and have considerable influence over both the strategic and technological directions of Bluetooth as a whole.

- Ericsson (founder member)
- Intel (founder member)
- Nokia (founder member)
- Toshiba (founder member)
- Microsoft (since 1999)
- Lenovo (since 2005, replaced founder member IBM after the divestment of personal computing division)
- Apple (since 2015)
- Google (since 2017)
- Telink Semiconductor (since 2019)

Each Promoter member has one seat (and one vote) on the board of directors and the Qualification Review Board (the body responsible for developing and maintaining the qualification process). They each may have multiple staff in the various working groups and committees that comprise the work of the SIG.

The SIG's website carries a full list of members.

=== Associate members ===
The Bluetooth SIG Associate membership fees have stayed the same since 2006. Associate membership is renewed annually and the yearly fee depends on the individual company's revenue. Companies with annual revenue in excess of $100M US are considered Large Associates and pay annual membership fees of $42,000 US. Small Associates are categorized as those organizations with revenue less than $100M US and join the SIG with an annual membership fee of $9,000 US. Associate members of the SIG get early access to draft specifications at versions 0.5 and 0.7 and are eligible to participate and gain a voting seat in working groups and committees—a key opportunity to work with other Associate and Promoter members on enhancing existing specifications. They are also eligible for enhanced marketing support, receive discounts on product qualification listings and SIG events including Bluetooth World and UnPlugFest (UPF) testing events.

=== Adopter members ===
Adopter membership in the SIG is free and entitles members to use published Bluetooth wireless specifications and Bluetooth trademarks. Adopter members do not have early access to unpublished specifications and may not participate in working groups or committees to influence the development of the technology.

=== Individuals ===
Membership is not currently open to individuals.

=== Universities ===
Universities or other educational facilities are not accepted for membership.

== Qualification ==
Next to the development of the technology itself, the qualification process is one of the most important aspects of Bluetooth technology, supporting interoperability, conformance to the Bluetooth specifications, and to strengthening the Bluetooth brand.

Members of the Bluetooth SIG must complete the qualification and declaration process for their Bluetooth enabled product(s) to demonstrate and declare compliance to the .

The primary objective of the qualification process is for members to demonstrate their product(s) compliance to the adopted specifications through testing and documentation. After qualification is completed, members need to complete the declaration process. Members declare their compliance to both the Bluetooth Patent/Copyright License Agreement and Bluetooth Trademark License Agreement ("BTLA").

An overview of both processes including steps of the processes, types and fees is available on the Bluetooth SIG public portal.

Bluetooth Qualification Experts (BQEs) and Bluetooth Qualification Test Facilities (BQTFs) are available to support members through the processes. Members uncertain or unfamiliar with the qualification process are encouraged to consider using one or both of these service types.

== See also ==
- Wireless LAN
- IEEE 802.15.1
