= Smart home hub =

Control center for a smart home

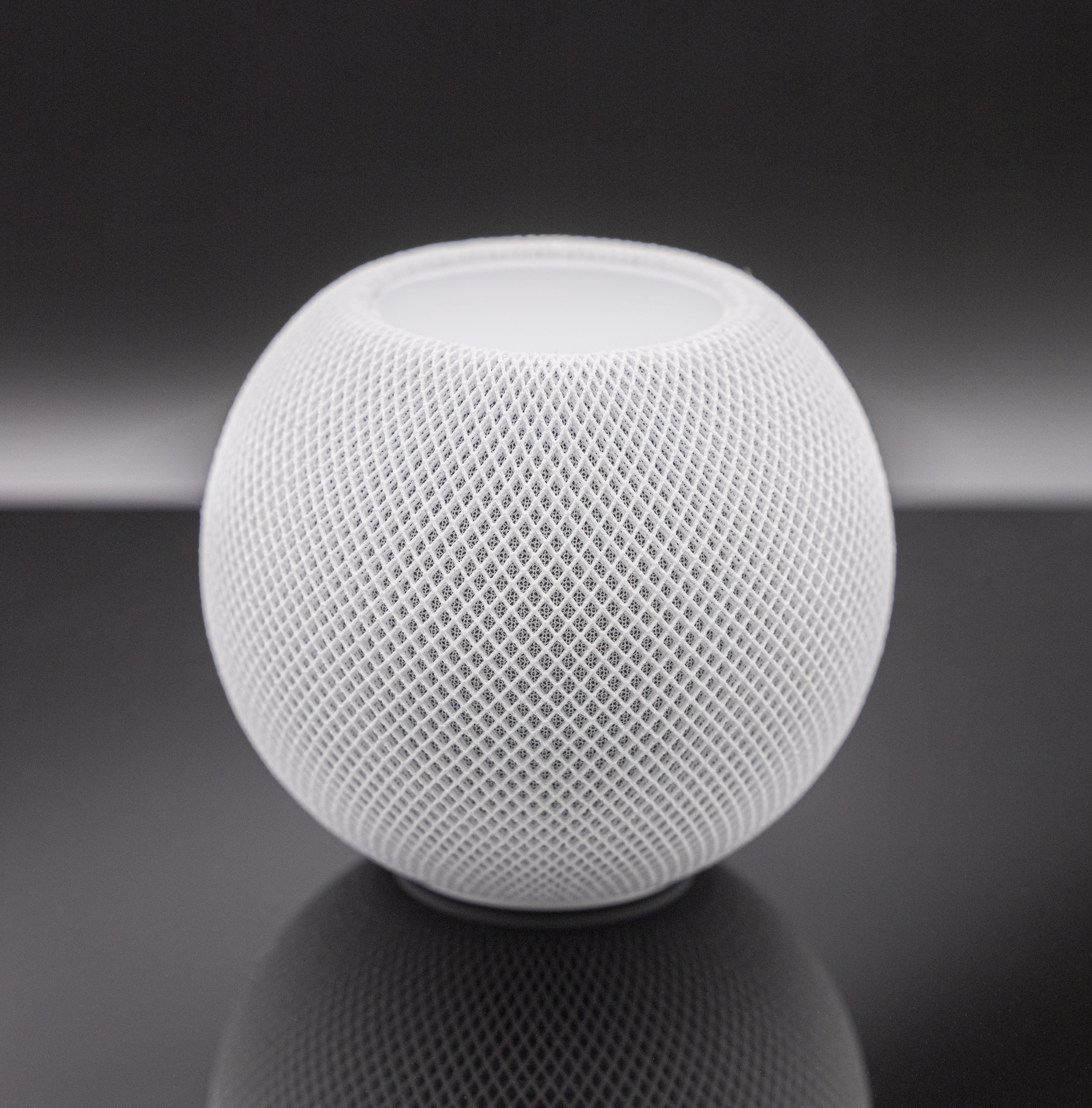
An Apple HomePod mini, an example of a smart home hub

A smart home hub, (sometimes also referred to as a smart hub, smart contoller or smart gateway) is a centralized control system that manages all operational processes, data processing, and decision-making through a central unit or application for a smart home. It enables the components of a smart home to communicate and respond to each other via communication through a single point. The smart home hub can consist of dedicated computer appliance, software appliance, or software running on computer hardware, and makes it possible to gather configuration, automation and monitoring of a smart house by communicating and controlling different smart devices that consist of for example home appliances, sensors and relays or robots, many of which are commonly categorized under Internet of things.

A smart home can contain one, several, or even no smart home hubs. When using several smart home hubs it is sometimes possible to connect them to each other. Some smart home hubs support a wider selection of components, while others are more specialized for controlling products within certain product groups or using certain wireless technologies (e.g. Wi-Fi, Bluetooth, Z-Wave, and/or Zigbee).

A smart speaker with a virtual assistant can often be used for speech input to a smart home hub.

== Open or closed source code ==
Smart home hubs can have software with open source code or use proprietary software with closed source code, and independently of this the application programming interface can be public or closed. Some smart home hubs must run on proprietary hardware, while others (e.g. Home Assistant) can be installed on generic hardware (e.g. a laptop or single-board computer with Linux).

== Examples of commercial smart home hubs ==
Some examples of smart home hubs with closed source code are:

- Logitech Harmony Hub
- SmartThings Hub
- Google Nest Hub
- Amazon Echo Show and Amazon Echo Plus which both integrates a Zigbee hub.
- Apple HomePod
- Xiaomi Hub

Some examples of smart home hubs based on free and open-source software are:

- Home Assistant
- OpenHAB

Some examples of smart home hubs with closed source code but an open application programming interface are:

- Homey

== Communication protocols ==
Various communication protocols can be used between smart home hubs and smart house components. The protocols can be grouped into wired and wireless technologies.

=== Wireless protocols ===
Some examples of wireless protocols commonly used in smart home hubs are:

- 2,45 Ghz (WiFi, Bluetooth, Zigbee, Thread, Matter)
- Z-Wave (868 Mhz)
- RF 868 (868 Mhz, various protocols)
- RF 433 (433 Mhz, various protocols)
- Infrared light (430 THz; 697 nm)

=== Wired protocols ===
There are several cabled bus systems, some of which are built directly into electric panels. Some examples of wired protocols commonly used in smart home hubs are:

- DALI, open standard for network-based lighting control in buildings, well suited for dimming.
- KNX, older and well-established open standard for network-based control of lighting, sensors, HVAC, etc. in buildings. There is also a wireless extension of KNX called KNX-RF.
- DMX, a standard for control of stage lighting, smoke machines and more, but also used to a certain extent for home automation due to the widespread use in professional stage equipment and good availability on the market.
- X10, widespread in older home automation equipment in the USA, but only used to a small extent in new installations.
- LonWorks, an open standard for networking platforms used for control applications of lighting and HVAC.
- MQTT, an open network protocol for machine to machine communication, particularly used for transmission of telemetry data in Internet of things components.
- BACnet, an open protocol (ISO 16484-5) for information exchange between building automation systems, regardless of the particular building service they perform. Designed for applications such as automation and control of heating, ventilating, and air-conditioning control (HVAC), lighting control, access control, fire detection systems, and associated equipment.
- Modbus, an openly published and royalty free data communications protocol, especially popular in industrial environments.
- Meter-Bus (M-Bus), an open standard for remote reading of consumption meters, e.g., water, gas or electricity meters.

== See also ==
- List of home automation software
- Smart speaker
- Matter
