= List of home automation software =

Home automation software facilitates control of devices connected within a home automation system. Commonly controlled devices include: lights, HVAC equipment, access control and sprinklers - although many more appliances continue to be added to the 'Smart Home'. Sensor devices, such as those to detect light or motion, may also be connected and managed to facilitate automations.

The software enables users to monitor their connected devices and also configure desired behaviours. Example behaviours include scheduling device activation/deactivation (e.g. turning sprinklers on at an appropriate time for a 20 minute period each day) and reactive event handling (e.g. turning lights on when motion is detected).

Typically the application will support multiple interfaces to the outside world, such as XMPP, email, Z-Wave, and X10.

Home automation software is often based on a client-server model, where a user is able to configure devices and their actions via a web or smartphone app and the connected devices orchestrated by a server-side software or 'hub' device.

The user interface of mass-market players (such as Apple) focus on rich user interfaces with the ability to configure straightforward actions. More advanced, niche or open-sourced, software allows users to write scripts in a programming language to handle more complex tasks. There are currently many competing home automation standards for both hardware and software.

== Open-source software ==
This is a list of software across multiple platforms which is designed to perform home automation.

| Name | Linux | Mac | Windows | Android | iOS | License | Technologies |
|---|---|---|---|---|---|---|---|
| AllJoyn (by AllSeen Alliance) | Yes | Yes | Yes | Yes | Yes | Apache 2.0 License | |
| Calaos | | | | | | | |
| Domoticz | Yes | | Yes | | | | |
| evcc | Yes | Yes | Yes | Control App | Control App | | |
| FHEM | Yes | | Yes | | | | |
| Homebridge | Yes | Yes | Yes | | | | |
| Home Assistant | Yes | Yes | Yes | Control App | Control App | Apache 2.0 License | As of April 2025, 3100 add-ons were officially listed as available for integration Popular examples include; Alexa, Bluetooth, ecobee, IFTTT, Google Cast (Chromecast and Google Home/Nest), Google Assistant, HomeKit, IKEA Home Smart, KNX, Kodi (XBMC), Lutron, Matter, MQTT, Philips Hue, Plex, Samsung/SmartThings, Shelly, Sonos, SwitchBot, Tuya, Xiaomi Smart Home (Mi Home), Zigbee, Z-Wave |
| IoBroker | Yes | | Yes | | | | |
| IoTivity (by Open Connectivity Foundation) | Yes | Yes | Yes | Yes | Yes | Apache 2.0 License | |
| Jeedom | Yes | | | | | | |
| LinuxMCE | Yes | | Control App | Control App | Control App | GPL | Asterisk, Bluetooth, KNX, 1-Wire, Serial, Wake on LAN (WoL), Z-Wave, X10, Infrared, GlobalCache, MythTV, Video Disc Recorder (VDR), Hulu, HDHomeRun |
| MisterHouse | | | | | | | |
| openHAB | Yes | Yes | Yes | Yes | Yes | Eclipse Public License | As of April 2025, 474 add-ons were available for integration. Popular examples include Alexa, Bluetooth, Bose, BTIcino, Chromecast, Daikin, IFTTT, Google Assistant, HomeKit, IKEA, KNX, Kodi (XBMC), Philips Hue, MQTT, Nest, Miele, MiHome, Samsung, Sonos, Tesla, Zigbee, ZWave |
| OpenRemote | Yes | Yes | Yes | Control App | Control App | AGPL | |
| QIVICON | Yes | Yes | Yes | Yes | Yes | Eclipse Public License 2.0 | HomeMatic, Zigbee |

== Closed-source software ==
| Name | Linux | Mac | Windows | Android | iOS | License | Technologies |
|---|---|---|---|---|---|---|---|
| Microsoft HomeOS | | | Yes | | | Academic license | |
| HomeSeer | Yes | Yes | Yes | Yes | Yes | | Integrations include (but are not limited to) Alexa, August Home, ecobee, IFTTT, Google Cast (Chromecast and Google Home/Nest), LIFX, MQTT, Node-RED, Philips Hue, Tuya, Zigbee, Z-Wave |
| HomeKit | | Yes | | | Yes | | HomeKit Accessory Protocol |

== Proprietary hardware ==
This is a list of platforms that require custom, closed hardware for home automation.

| Name | Configuration Tools | Technologies |
|---|---|---|
| AMX LLC | Netlinx Studio, TPDesign | Configuration tools only work on Windows. |
| Control4 | Composer | Uses a Linux kernel, configuration tools only work on Windows. Platform also supports open hardware utilising the Z-Wave standard. |
| Homey | | Some of the available integrations are: Alexa, ecobee, IFTTT, Google Cast (Chromecast and Google Home/Nest), Google Assistant, IKEA Home Smart, KNX, Lutron, Matter, MQTT, Philips Hue, Plex, Samsung/SmartThings, Shelly, Sonos, SwitchBot, Tuya, Xiaomi Smart Home (Mi Home), Zigbee, Z-Wave |
| Insteon | Insteon Hub, Insteon for Windows | Lighting, appliances, sensors. Mobile apps for Android and iOS, configuration tools only work with Windows. |
| Lutron | | Focused on lighting and shades, configuration tools only work on Windows. |
| SmartThings | | Lighting, appliances, sensors. Mobile apps for Android and iOS. |
| Vivint | | Sensors and one-touch hardware for security. |
