= Home Assistant =

Home automation software

- Original author: Paulus Schoutsen
- Developers: Open Home Foundation, Home Assistant Core Team and Community
- Release: 17 September 2013 (13 years ago)
- Stable release: 2026.10 / 7 October 2026; 32 days ago
- Written in: Python for the backend (core and integration components), plus TypeScript for the frontend (web-based UI)
- Operating system: Software appliance / Virtual appliance (Linux)
- Platform: AArch64/ARM64 (64-bit ARM) and x86-64 (x64/AMD64)
- Type: Home automation, smart home technology, Internet of things, task automator
- License: Apache License v2.0 (free and open-source)
- Website: www.home-assistant.io
- Repository: github.com/home-assistant

Home Assistant is free and open-source software used to enable centralized home automation. It is a smart home controller platform that serves both as a smart home hub (sometimes called a smart gateway) and an integration platform designed for interoperability, allowing users to have a single point of control and enable automating different smart home devices from a central location regardless of manufacturer or brand. The software operates with local control and does not require cloud services, allowing it to function independently of specific Internet of things (IoT) ecosystems. The user interface can be accessed through web browsers and mobile apps for Android and iOS. Voice commands are supported via virtual assistants including Google Assistant, Amazon Alexa, Apple Siri, and Home Assistant's built-in Assist local voice assistant.

The Home Assistant software application is most commonly installed as a computer appliance with Home Assistant Operating System (a.k.a. Home Assistant OS, a.k.a. HAOS, formerly HassOS) that will act as a central control system for home automation (commonly called a smart home hub, gateway, bridge, or controller), that has the purpose of controlling IoT connectivity technology devices, software, applications and services from third parties via modular integration components, including native integration components for common wired or wireless communication protocols and standards for IoT products such as Bluetooth, Zigbee, Z-Wave, EnOcean, and Matter/Thread (used to create either local personal area networks or direct ad hoc connections with small smart home devices using low-power digital radios), or Wi‑Fi– and Ethernet- connected devices on a home local area network (home LAN, or HAN).

Home Assistant supports controlling devices and services connected via either open and proprietary ecosystems or commercial smart home hubs, gateways, or bridges as long they provide public access via some kind of open API or MQTT interface to allow for third-party integration over either the local area network or Internet, which includes integrations for Alexa Smart Home (Amazon Echo), Google Nest (Google Home), HomeKit (Apple Home), Samsung SmartThings, Heiman and Philips Hue.

Information from all devices and their attributes (entities) that the application sees can be used and controlled via automation or script using scheduling or subroutines (including preconfigured blueprints), e.g. for controlling lighting, climate, entertainment systems and smart home appliances.

== History ==
The project was started as a Python application by Paulus Schoutsen in September 2013 and first published publicly on GitHub in November 2013.

In July 2017, a managed operating system called Hass.io was introduced to make it easier to use Home Assistant on single-board computers like the Raspberry Pi series. This has since been renamed to Home Assistant Operating System (and is often referred to as Home Assistant OS), and uses the concept of a bundled supervisor management system that allows users to manage, backup, update the local installation and enable the option to extend the functionality of the software with add-ons (plug-in applications) to run as services on the same platform for tighter integrations with Home Assistant core.

An optional Home Assistant Cloud subscription service was introduced in December 2017 as an external cloud computing service officially supported by the Home Assistant founders to solve the complexities associated with secured remote access, as well as linking to various third-party cloud services, such as Amazon Alexa and Google Assistant. Nabu Casa, Inc. was formed in September 2018 to take over this subscription service. The company's funding is based solely on revenue from the Home Assistant Cloud subscription service. The money earned is used to finance the project's infrastructure and to pay for full-time employees contributing to the Home Assistant and ESPHome projects.

In January 2020, branding was adjusted to make it easier to refer to different parts of the project. The main piece of software was renamed Home Assistant Core, while the full suite of software with the Hass.io embedded operating system with a bundled supervisor management system was renamed Home Assistant (though it is also commonly referred to as HAOS, short for Home Assistant OS).

In April 2024, ownership of the Home Assistant source code and brand name was transferred to the newly created Open Home Foundation non-profit organization. The founder of Home Assistant made statements in the announcement that this transfer of ownership and change in governance should mean no practical change to its developers or users, as it was primarily done to ensure that Home Assistant source code will remain a free and open-source software and with a continued focus on privacy and local control. The press release stated plans to develop Home Assistant from an enthusiast platform into a mainstream consumer product. Ownership of many of the open-source libraries that Home Assistant uses as dependencies and other related entities was also transferred to the Open Home Foundation non-profit organization.

== Features ==
=== Hardware ===
Home Assistant is supported and can be installed on multiple platforms. Official and third-party hardware appliances with Home Assistant pre-installed are available for purchase from a few different manufacturers for a plug-and-play solution. Home Assistant can be installed do-it-yourself style on almost any computer, like a home server or network-attached storage (NAS), but note that Home Assistant is designed to run all the time.

Home Assistant's operating system can be installed directly on many hardware platforms, including single-board computers (for example Intel NUC (mini-PC)), Raspberry Pi and Hardkernel ODROID, as well as virtual machines and most NAS systems. Installing the Home Assistant Operating System image on such other officially recommended hardware platforms requires installing or flashing a corresponding system image onto local storage from which the Home Assistant operating system can boot. Optionally it is possible to install the Home Assistant container on other operating systems like Linux, macOS, or Windows (under Windows Subsystem for Linux), but it's then not possible to install add-ons and other features that is built-into the supervised operating system.

It is possible to use Home Assistant as a IoT bridge and gateway for smart home devices using different Internet-of-Things technologies like Zigbee, Z-Wave, Thread, and Bluetooth; necessary radio and bus-adapter hardware can be mounted via USB ports, Serial, or GPIO. It can connect directly or indirectly to local IoT devices, control hubs/gateways/bridges or cloud services from other open and closed smart home ecosystems vendors.

==== Official Home Assistant branded hardware ====
Home Assistant partnered with the commercial Nabu Casa company to make officially licensed hardware, including appliances for running Home Assistant Operating System and IoT radio dongles.

In December 2020, a customized ODROID N2+ computer appliance with bundled software was introduced under the product name "Home Assistant Blue" as an officially supported common hardware reference platform. The package is called "ODROID-N2+ Home Assistant Bundle" when sold without the official custom-made enclosure. It comes with Home Assistant OS pre-installed on local eMMC storage, a power adapter, and a custom Home Assistant-themed enclosure. Home Assistant founders made it clear that the release of official hardware would not keep them from supporting other hardware platforms like the Raspberry Pi series.

In September 2021, Home Assistant developers at Nabu Casa announced a crowdfunding campaign on Crowd Supply for pre-orders of "Home Assistant Yellow" (initially called "Home Assistant Amber"), a new official home automation controller hardware platform with Home Assistant pre-installed, a spiritual successor to "Home Assistant Blue". The device uses a carrier board (or "baseboard") for a computer-on-modules compatible with the Raspberry Pi Compute Module 4 (CM4) embedded computer as well as an integrated M.2 expansion slot meant for either an NVMe SSD as expanded storage or for an AI accelerator card, and an onboard EFR32 based radio module made by Silicon Labs capable of acting as a Zigbee Coordinator or Thread Leader (Thread Border Router), as well as optional variant with PoE (Power over Ethernet) support. The most otherwise notable features missing on Home Assistant Yellow are an HDMI or DisplayPort to connect a monitor (which is likely due to it, like most smart home hubs, being purpose-built to act as a headless system), as well as lack of onboard Bluetooth, Wi-Fi, and a USB 3.0 port by default. Shipping of "Home Assistant Yellow" was targeted for June 2022.

In June 2022, Home Assistant developers at Nabu Casa announced their officially supported "Home Assistant SkyConnect" IoT radio adapter (which was later relaunched as "Home Assistant Connect ZBT-1"), a multi-protocol IoT USB radio dongle capable of Zigbee or Thread low-power wireless protocols, that enable plug-and-play support for either Home Assistant's built-in Zigbee gateway integration (the "ZHA" component) or their Thread integration.

In September 2023, Home Assistant developers at Nabu Casa announced "Home Assistant Green", an entry-level computer appliance for running Home Assistant. It does, however, only feature an Ethernet port (for connection to the user's LAN) and two USB ports. That is, unlike the previous Home Assistant Yellow this new computer appliance does not include any built-in IoT radios for Zigbee and Thread low-power wireless protocols, so users wanting to connect such devices will need to buy separate USB radio dongles for each such protocol.

=== Dashboard ===
The primary front-end user interface (UI) system is a dashboard called Home Assistant dashboards, which offers different cards to display information and control devices. Cards can display information provided by a connected device or control a resource (lights, thermostats, and other devices). The interface design language is based on Material Design and can be customized using global themes. The GUI is customizable using the integrated editor or by modifying the underlying YAML code. Cards can be extended with custom resources, which are often created by community members.

==== Companion apps ====
Home Assistant dashboards (i.e., its frontend user interface) can also be accessed via Home Assistant's official second screen implementations like their mobile apps, which they call "Companion apps" (available for Android and iOS).

=== Automation ===
Home Assistant acts as a central smart home controller hub by combining different devices and services in a single place and integrating them as entities. The provided rule-based system for automation allows creating custom routines based on a trigger event, conditions and actions, including scripts. These enable building automation, alarm management of security alarms and video surveillance for home security system as well as monitoring of energy measuring devices. Since December 2020, it is possible to use automation blueprints - pre-made automation from the community that can be easily added to an existing system.

== Security ==
Home Assistant is an on-premises software product that uses local control. According to sources, this architecture differs from closed-source home automation software that relies on proprietary hardware and cloud services.

There is no remote access enabled by default and data is stored solely on the device itself. User accounts can be secured with two-factor authentication to prevent access even if the user password becomes compromised. Add-ons receive a security rating based on their access to system resources.

At the beginning of January 2021, cybersecurity analyst Oriel Goel found a directory traversal security vulnerability in custom integrations from third parties. Home Assistant made a public service announcement on January 22, 2021, disclosing the vulnerability problems and informing that the issues had been addressed in Home Assistant version 2021.1.5, which was released on January 23. Later in January 2021, it made a second security disclosure about another security vulnerability that had also been fixed. There is no information about whether any vulnerability was ever exploited.

In March 2023, a full authentication bypass was discovered in Home Assistant, earning a CVE score of 10/10. This security issue affected Home Assistant's default remote access solution, Nabu Casa, due to Nabu Casa's remote access security model that exposed the local Home Assistant server to the public internet. This security issue allowed bad actors full control of any Home Assistant server they could access due to the full auth bypass.

== Reception ==
Home Assistant has in the past been included in a number of product and platform comparisons, where it has been criticized for having a steep learning curve and being too complicated for new users to get started, for example, requiring users to write file-based setup and configuration procedures using text-based YAML markup language instead of a graphical user interface for all setup and configuration options, as well requiring users to learn low-level operations to create and maintain automations. However, newer versions of Home Assistant produced by the core development team make the configuration (from initial installation as well as most basic configurations) easier to use by allowing configuration using the web-based graphical user interface plus enable UI-based automation creation and editing (while keeping the original YAML scripting language hidden under the hood but still having it available for very advanced users and developers), but while it becoming more user-friendly, the sheer number of features and customization options can be overwhelming for some users, and some technical knowledge is still helpful for advanced configurations, complex automation setups, and troubleshooting. As such Home Assistant can be more challenging to get started with and use compared to simpler platforms like Apple Home or Google Home.

At the GitHub's "State of the Octoverse" in 2025, Home Assistant again made the top-10 list of top open source projects by contributors. And at the GitHub's "State of the Octoverse" in 2024, Home Assistant became the top open source project on GitHub by contributors, with more than 21,000 users contributing, which only included the Home Assistant core application (i.e. just the main backend and not the frontend and or any of the other libraries that the project develops as dependecies for Home Assistant). Looking back at GitHub's "State of the Octoverse" in 2019 they then listed Home Assistant as the tenth biggest open-source project on its platform with 6,300 contributors.

Home Assistant took second place in 2017 and 2018 for the Thomas Krenn Award (formerly Open Source Grant), later winning first place in 2019. Home Assistant also won a DINACon award in 2018 for their "Open Internet Award" category.

Home Assistant also earned the top spot of users "Favorite Software" in selfh.st's Self-Host User Survey in 2025, and second place in 2024.

== See also ==
- List of home automation software
- List of automation protocols
- Index of home automation articles
- Smart home hub
- Smart speaker
- Virtual assistant
- Home automation for the elderly and disabled
- Access control
- Smart lock
- Smart device
- Web of Things
- Smart environment
- Smart grid
- Home server
- Home network
- Matter (standard)
