= Qivicon =

Alliance of home automation companies

- Qivicon connected home
- Formation: 2011; 15 years ago
- Founder: Deutsche Telekom
- Type: Alliance
- Purpose: Create a vendor neutral protocol for home automation
- Location: Bonn, Germany
- Region served: Germany and worldwide
- Products: Smart home hub and protocols
- Website: www.qivicon.com

Qivicon is a cross-vendor wireless home automation alliance that allows connections to products in the areas of energy, security, and comfort. It connects and combines controllable devices made by different manufacturers such as motion detectors, smoke detectors, water detectors, wireless adapters for power outlets, door and window contact, temperature and humidity sensors, wireless switches, carbon monoxide sensors, thermostats, cameras, household appliances (e. g. washing machines, dryers, coffee machines), weather stations, sound systems, and lighting controls.

It was founded in 2011 by Deutsche Telekom and forms part of its home automation project. The companies in the alliance collaborate on cross-vendor wireless home automation and Internet of things (IoT) systems that have been available in the German market since the fall of 2013.

Qivicon was started in Germany and the alliance has stated that it would like to expand "Smart Home" worldwide. The alliance uses Smart Home optimized wireless protocols to try and make solutions easy to install in any home without needing to lay cables. The technical platform is open for companies of all sizes and in all industries worldwide. In 2016 Deutsche Telekom integrated the Amazon Alexa into the Qivicon smart home platform.

== History ==
The alliance was founded in 2011 and the Qivicon platform was launched in the German market in the fall of 2013.

The platform's technical control unit, its home base, is connected to the Internet via a broadband connection in the house or apartment. In August 2016, Qivicon launched a new generation of the home base focusing on international markets. The range of different models will keep up with the diverse range of wireless protocols found throughout the international market. The models all have an identical outward appearance. But they differ in terms of their pre-installed protocols. For example, the model designed for the German market, and several other markets, already includes the protocols HomeMatic, ZigBee Pro and the inclusion of HomeMatic IP and DECT ULE has also been completed. Another model includes the ZigBee Pro and Z-Wave radio modules. All versions of the new home base can be connected to home DSL routers either by cable, wirelessly, via Wi-Fi or via Deutsche Telekom's Speedport Smart router.

The system can be expanded to include other wireless standards by means of USB sticks for which there are four corresponding slots in the home base of the first generation and two slots in the second generation. Qivicon partners’ devices can be controlled and monitored via various partner apps for the smartphone, the tablet or the PC. Since November 2017 Qivicon is compatible with Alexa from Amazon. Users can control lights, blinds or alarm systems with their voice via Amazon Echo or Google Home.

In March 2017, Deutsche Telekom launched a White Label Smart Home portfolio that includes platform, gateways, applications, compatible devices and services. The portfolio was designed to help telecommunications service providers, utility providers, hardware manufacturers and other enterprises create and offer smart home services.

In 2018, Deutsche Telekom extended its international footprint within the smart home sector by partnering with Cosmote, the largest mobile operator in Greece and part of the OTE group, as well as Hitch in Norway, adding Greece and Norway to Qivicon's footprint of Germany, Slovakia, the Netherlands, Austria, and Italy.

In 2018, AV-Test, an IT security test institution, rated Qivicon as “secure”. It found that the Smart Home platform used encryption for communication and provided protection from unauthorized access.

== Members ==
By 2014, the alliance consisted of over 43 companies in different industries such as energy, electrical and household appliances, security and telecommunications. Qivicon partners include Deutsche Telekom, E wie Einfach, eQ-3, Miele, Samsung and Philips.

In March 2018, Deutsche Telekom announced that it had integrated the Home Connect platform, which works with Bosch and Siemens connected devices, into Qivicon to enable greater functionality between the two. For example, as well as being able to control connected Bosch and Siemens appliances directly via the Home Connect app. Deutsche Telekom also announced a number of new compatible devices to broaden the Qivicon portfolio, such as the Nest Protect smoke and carbon monoxide alarm.

- EnBW
- eQ-3
- Miele
- Samsung
- Deutsche Telekom
- Assa Abloy
- bitronvideo
- Centralite
- Cosmote
- digitalSTROM
- D-Link
- DOM Technologies
- Entega
- E WIE EINFACH
- eww Gruppe
- Gigaset
- Google
- Huawei
- Hitch
- Home Connect
- Junkers
- KPN
- Logitech
- Nest
- Netatmo
- Osram
- PaX
- Philips
- Plugwise
- RheinEnergie
- Sengled
- Smappee
- Sonos
- Stadtwerke Bonn
- VW

== Awards ==
Qivicon has won repeat awards from the international management consulting company Frost & Sullivan’s. In 2016, Frost & Sullivan has awarded Qivicon with the European Connected Home New Product Innovation Award. In 2014, the smart home platform has been awarded with the European Visionary Innovation Leadership Award in recognition of what the management consulting company saw as the most innovative Smart Home solution of the year.

== See also ==
- Home Assistant
- List of home automation software
- Open Connectivity Foundation
- OpenHAB

== Bibliography ==
- Ohland, Günther. Smart-Living. Books on Demand, Norderstedt 2013. ISBN 978-3-7322923-0-1.
