= Somfy =

French group of companies

- Industry: activities of head offices
- Number of locations: 60 (2016)
- Number of employees: 8400 (2016)

Somfy is a French group of companies founded in 1969, some of the largest manufacturers and suppliers of controllers and drives for entrance gates, garage doors, window blinds and awnings. They also produce other home automation products such as security devices.

Somfy is a member of the home automation committees for Matter, Thread and the Connectivity Standards Alliance. Somfy has stated an intent to implement to the Matter standard first using Matter over Zigbee through a bridge, and that previous "Zigbee motors will not become Matter compatible through a firmware upgrade". As of 2025, no Matter certified Somfy products have been announced.
