= Tuya Inc. =

Chinese artificial intelligence platform

- Native name: 杭州涂鸦科技有限公司
- Type: Public
- Traded as: NYSE: TUYA; SEHK: 2391
- Founded: June 16, 2014; 12 years ago in Hangzhou, China
- Founder: Xueji (Jerry) Wan
- Area served: Worldwide
- Revenue: ▲US$321.8 million(2025); ▲US$302 million (2021); US$180 million (2020)
- Website: tuya.com

Tuya Inc. (Chinese: 涂鸦智能; lit. 'Graffiti Intelligence'; dba Tuya Smart) is a Chinese artificial intelligence and Internet of things (IoT) platform as a service (PaaS) provider founded in 2014.

== Company ==
The company provides a cloud development and management platform to developers, brands, and OEMs to program, manage, and monetize smart home and IoT devices.

Tuya is supported by New Enterprise Associates and Tencent. In March 2021 it raised $915 million in a U.S. initial public offering on the NYSE. It launched a global offering on the Hong Kong Stock Exchange in July 2022, giving itself dual primary listings in Hong Kong and New York. Tuya is incorporated in the Cayman Islands.

Internationally, Tuya partners with companies including Schneider Electric, Lenovo, and Philips. It is a member on the board of directors of the Connectivity Standards Alliance and has committed to supporting the Matter connectivity standard.

== Compatibility ==
The Tuya platform is compatible with most common smart-home platforms such as Amazon Alexa, Google Assistant, and Samsung SmartThings, allowing customers to control IoT devices using such devices.

Tuya smart devices do not natively support Apple HomeKit as they rely on cloud-based infrastructure while Apple's protocol is local. However, Tuya officially maintains a HomeKit switch device. additionally Tuya-based dual-mode HomeKit hardware gateways, or open-source software like Home Assistant can be used.

== Media reports ==
In 2021, multiple media outlets reported an investigation by cybersecurity firm Dark Cubed, suggesting that Tuya's network-connected devices were subject to China's Data Security Law, and "are woefully insecure and sending data to China."

Tuya Smart was invited to and participated in the China-Europe Cyber Norms Forum, co-hosted by the Research Center for Global Cyberspace Governance (RCGCG) and the Cyber Security Governance of Leiden University in The Hague, Netherlands, on March 20, 2024. The forum brought together experts and professionals from the European Institute for Security Studies, the Cyber Security Governance of Leiden University, DigiChina, Bonn University, and TÜV SÜD. Representatives from prominent EU programs, such as the EU Cyber Direct-EU Cyber Diplomacy Initiative project and The Hague Programme on International Cyber Security, were also in attendance to collectively explore the latest developments and emerging trends in cybersecurity."
