= Philips Hue =

Smart lightbulb brand

- Type: LED lamp
- Manufacturer: Signify N.V.
- Available: Yes
- Models: Generation 1 October 29, 2012; 14 years ago Generation 2 October 4, 2015; 11 years ago Generation 3 October 2, 2016; 10 years ago
- Website: www.philips-hue.com

Philips Hue is a line of smart LED lamps and accessories which can be controlled Wirelessly. The Philips Hue line were the first commercially available smart bulbs on the market. The lamps are currently created and manufactured by Signify N.V., formerly the Philips Lighting division of Royal Philips N.V.

== Products ==
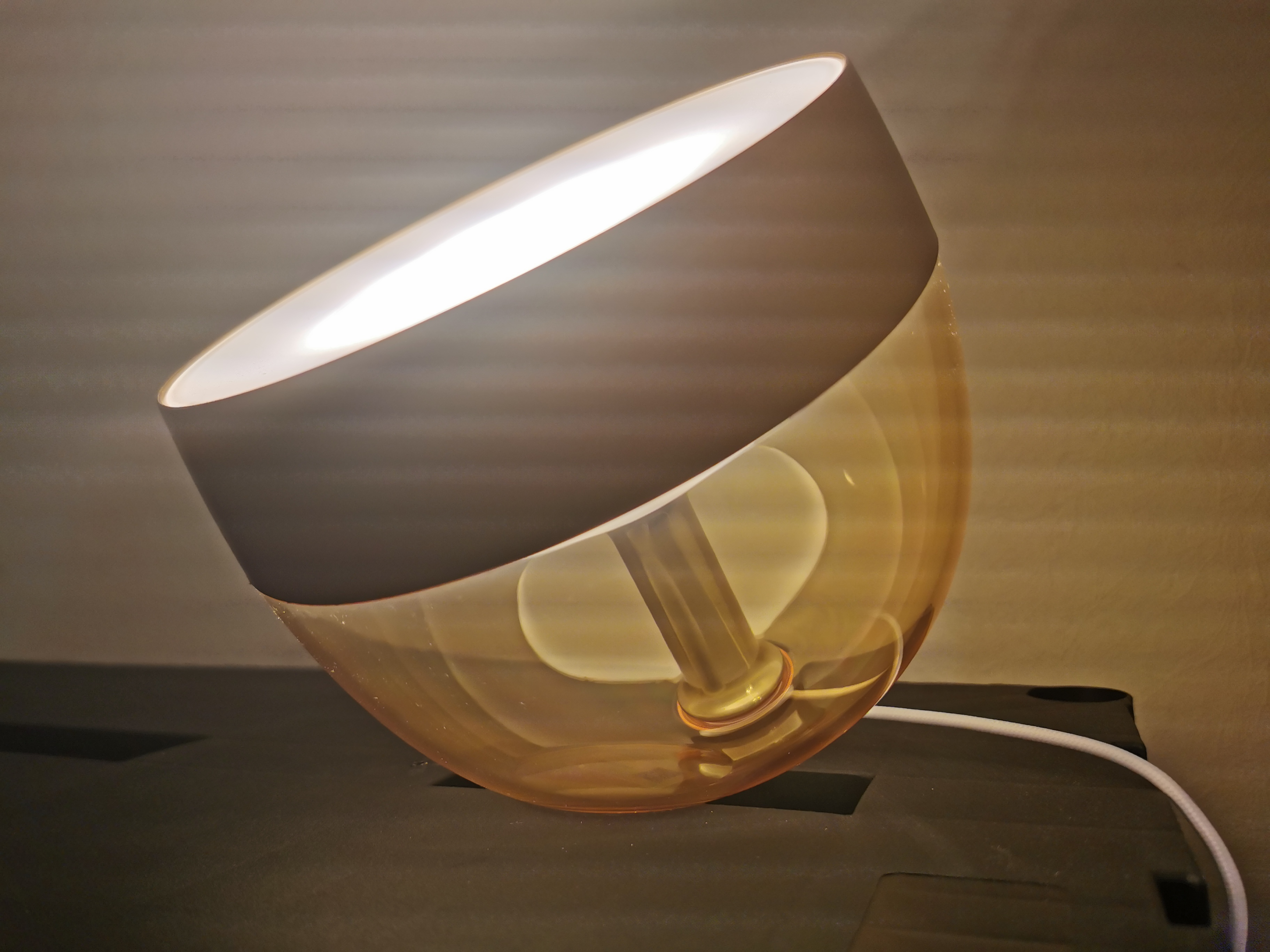
2020 Hue Iris (gold) with white light

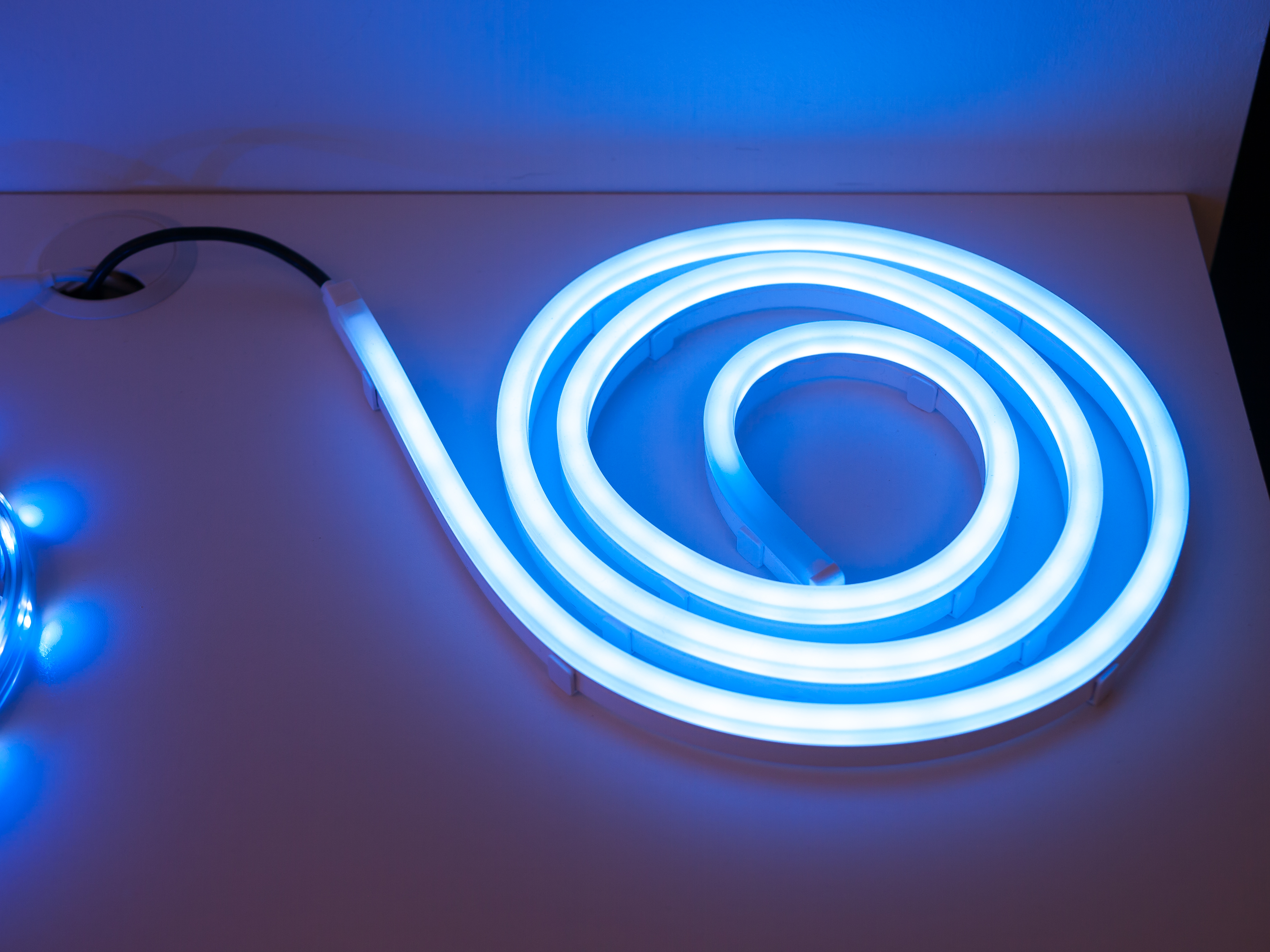
Hue Lightstrip Outdoor strip light

=== Operation ===
The Hue system was released in October 2012 through the Apple Store, and was marketed as the first iOS-controlled lighting appliance. Products released before 2019 use the Zigbee Light Link protocol, a compatible subset of Zigbee 3.0, to communicate, while lighting products released later use either Bluetooth or Zigbee 3.0. Smart switches, motion detectors, and other accessory devices such as the Hue HDMI sync originally used only the Zigbee Home Automation protocol, but later supported Zigbee 3.0. Hue system components can be controlled over the Internet, typically by smartphone apps over cellular or Wi-Fi networks, or a Home Automation voice command interface. Commands are delivered to the bridge via a wired Ethernet connection which transmits the commands to the devices over the Zigbee mesh network. The initial system had bulbs capable of producing up to 600 lumens, a limit later increased to 1600 lumens.

The Hue Bridge is the central controller of the lighting system which allows the bulbs to communicate the app and smart home platforms. The round first-generation Hue Bridge was released in 2012 and supported Google Home and Amazon Alexa. In 2016, Philips released a new square-shaped second-generation bridge with increased memory and processor speed, support for up to 63 devices, and integration with Apple HomeKit which replaced the round first-generation bridge. The first-generation bridge received its final software update in April 2020, and support from the Philips web servers was discontinued. Functionality including grouping lights into rooms and scheduling scenes that depended on Philips servers to pack the instructions into a form the bridge executed could no longer be created. Users of the first-generation bridge had to purchase a second-generation bridge to be able to control their configuration. The Hue Bridge Pro was released in 2025 and includes a faster processor, more memory, support for up to 150 lights and 50 accessories, Matter support and built-in Wi-Fi.

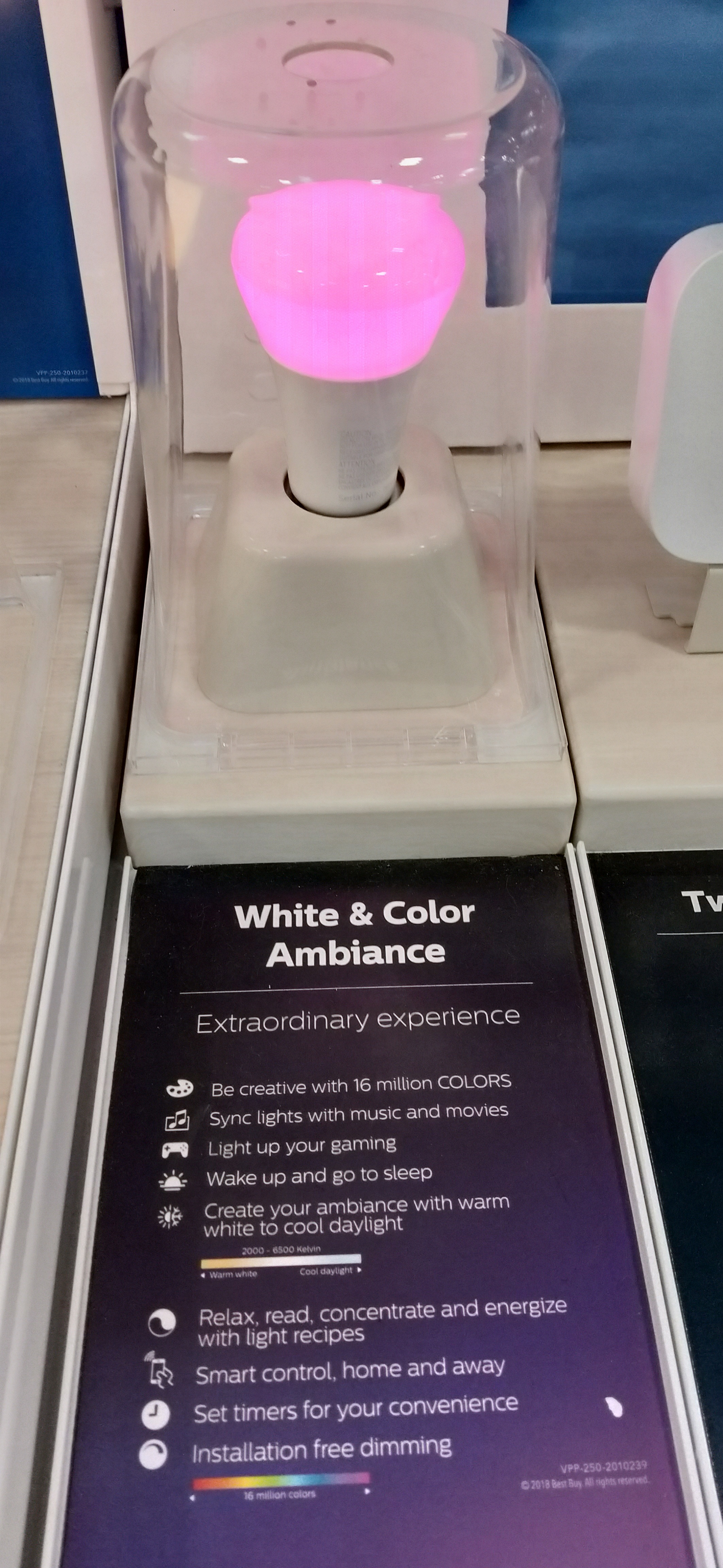
Hue White and Color Ambiance

In July 2018, an outdoor version of the Philips Hue suite was introduced, and in October 2018 a suite of entertainment-focused, free-standing light fittings. In January 2019 Philips announced outdoor sensors and lights.

== Color ranges ==
Three different Philips Hue color types are available, all dimmable: White, White Ambiance, and White and Color Ambiance. The White bulbs produce white light with a color temperature of 2700 K (warm); the White Ambiance bulbs produce white light of color temperature adjustable between 2200 K (warm soft white) and 6500 K (daylight). The White and Color Ambiance range can generate white light adjustable from 2000 K to 6500 K, and also adjustable colored light.

== Bulbs with Bluetooth ==
Since June 2019, all Philips hue bulbs support Bluetooth through the Philips Hue Bluetooth app, so that a Philips Hue Bridge is no longer necessary for basic operation, though it enables further features. Up to ten bulbs can be controlled by Bluetooth (which requires location services to be enabled) over a range stated to be 30 feet (9.1 m).

Use of the Hue Bridge enables control of up to 50 lights, assignation of room names, full voice control, configuration of Hue smart accessories, setting of timers and schedules, away-from-home control, routines to switch on and off, and synchronisation of lights with entertainment devices.

== Security concern ==
A security flaw was found and resolved in 2016: the bulbs, and potentially other Zigbee devices, could be remotely controlled by anyone, using inexpensive equipment. Researchers tricked the lights into installing a malicious firmware update enabling them to be controlled from 70 metres (230 ft) away.

== Reception ==
In an article in Forbes, Seth Porges called Phillips Hue the "best product of 2012". PC Magazine reviewed the white variation and named it as an editors' choice, saying it was bright and affordable and had many features.

== Gallery ==
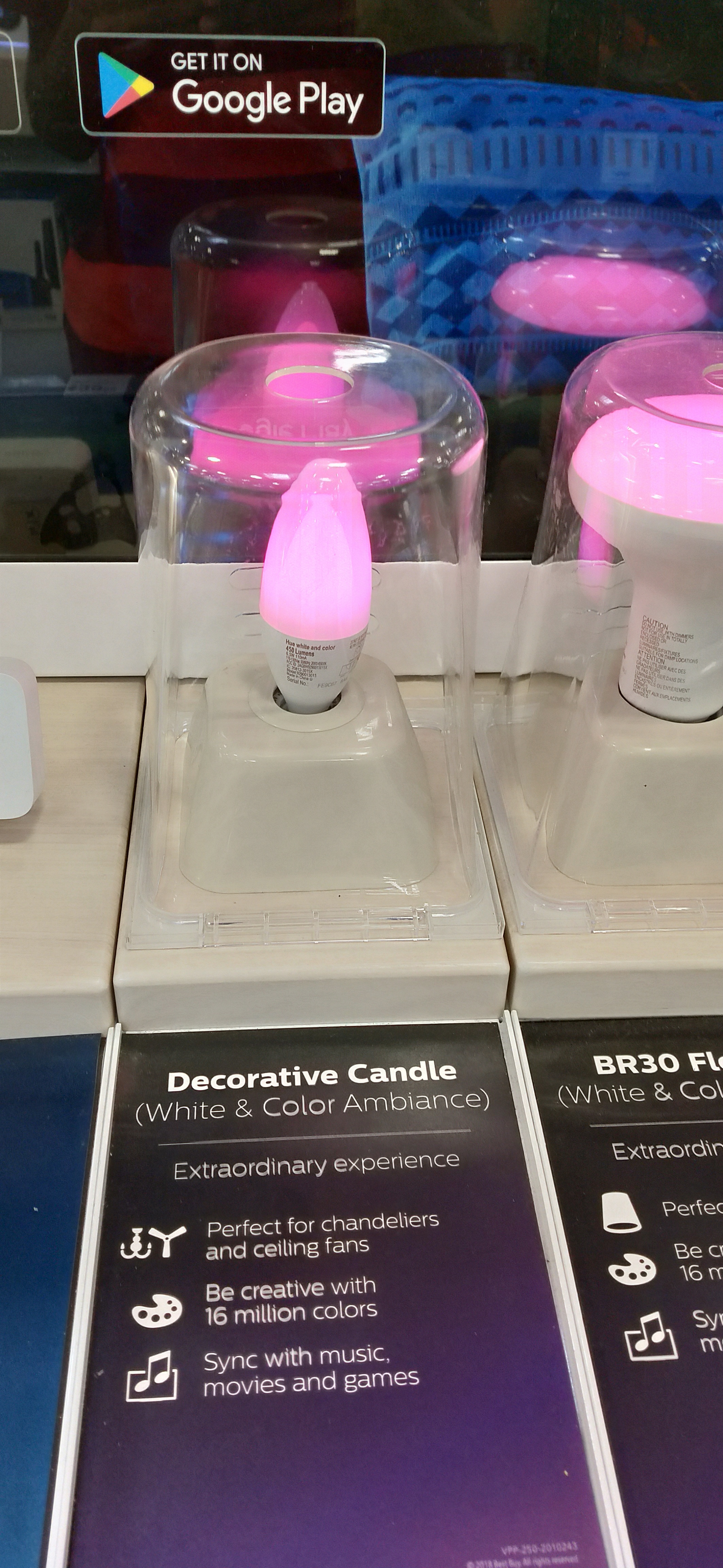
Hue candelabra lamp

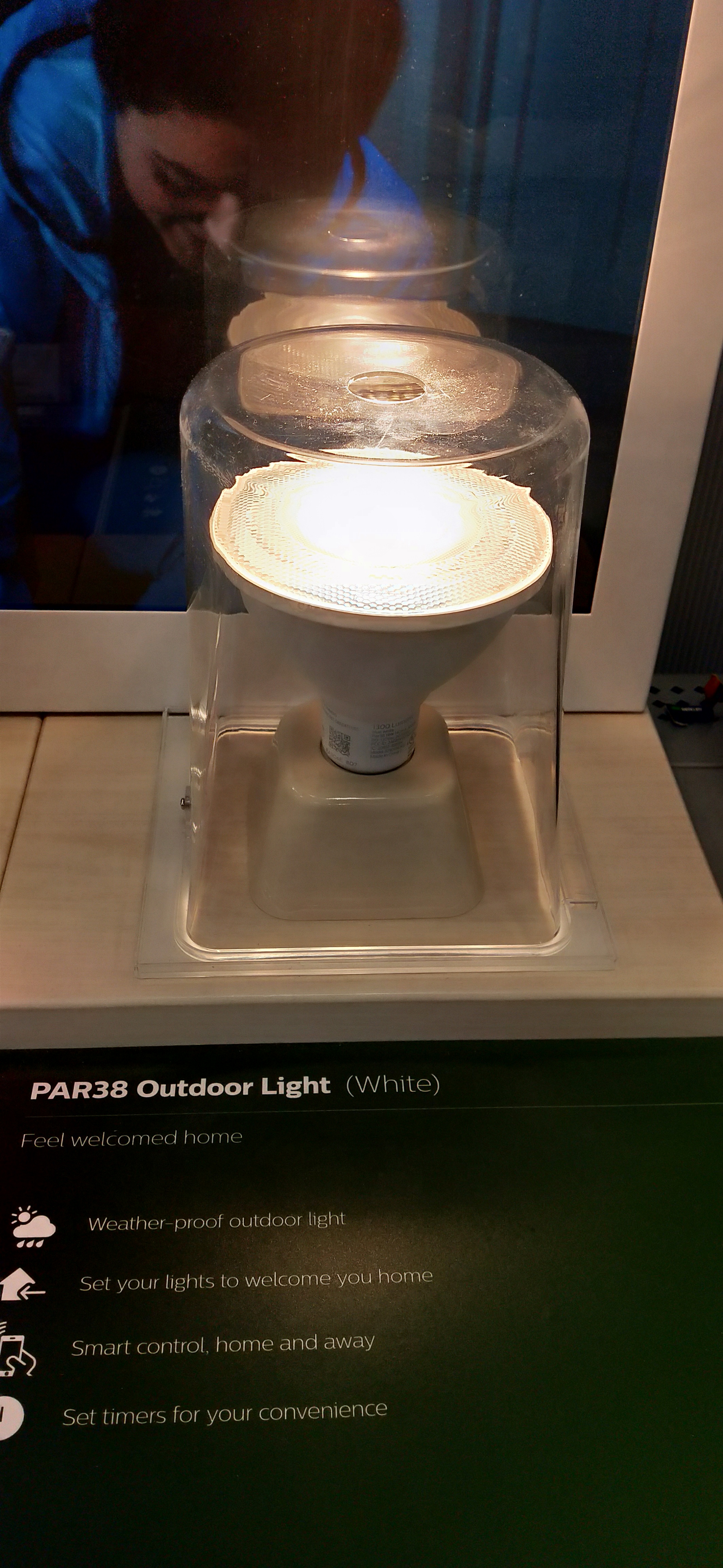
Hue sealed beam lamp

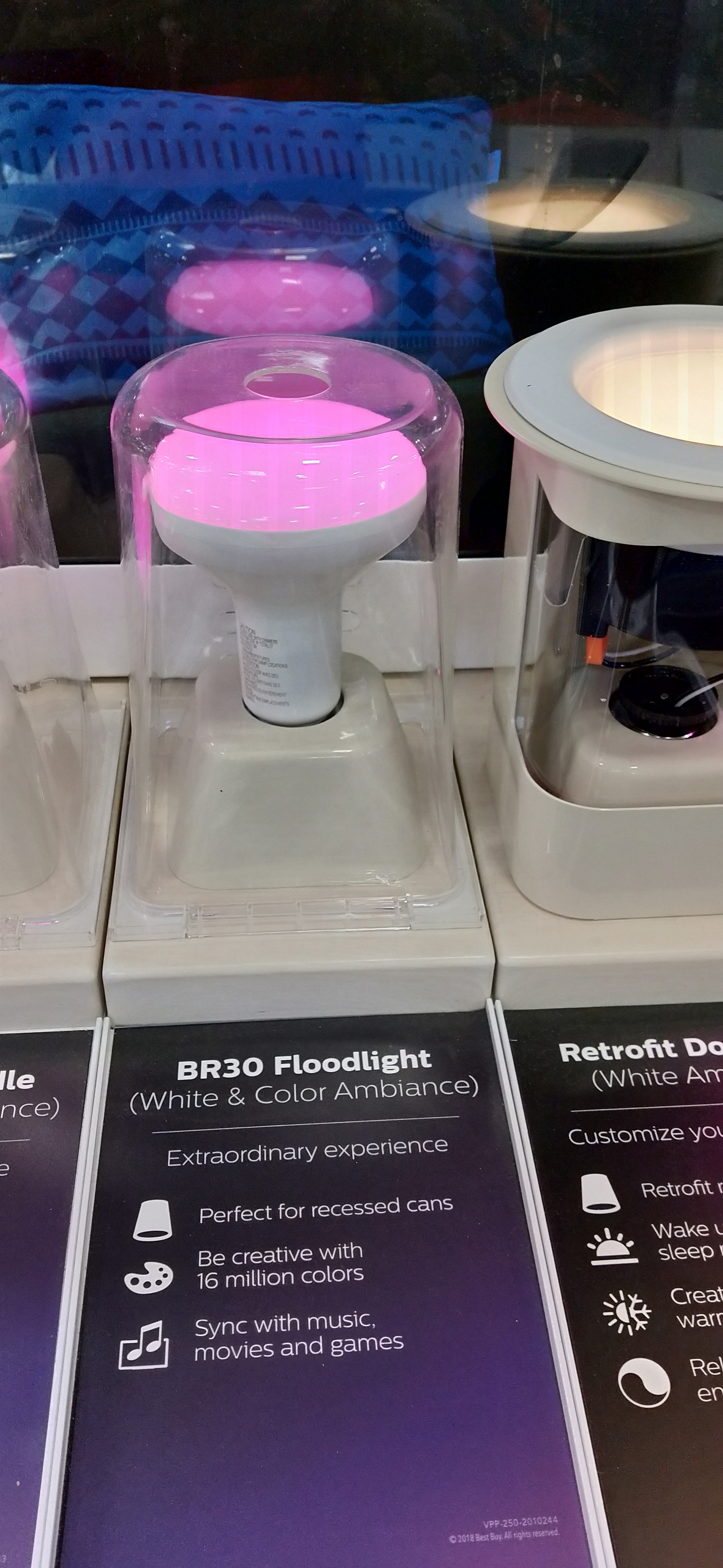
Hue floodlamp

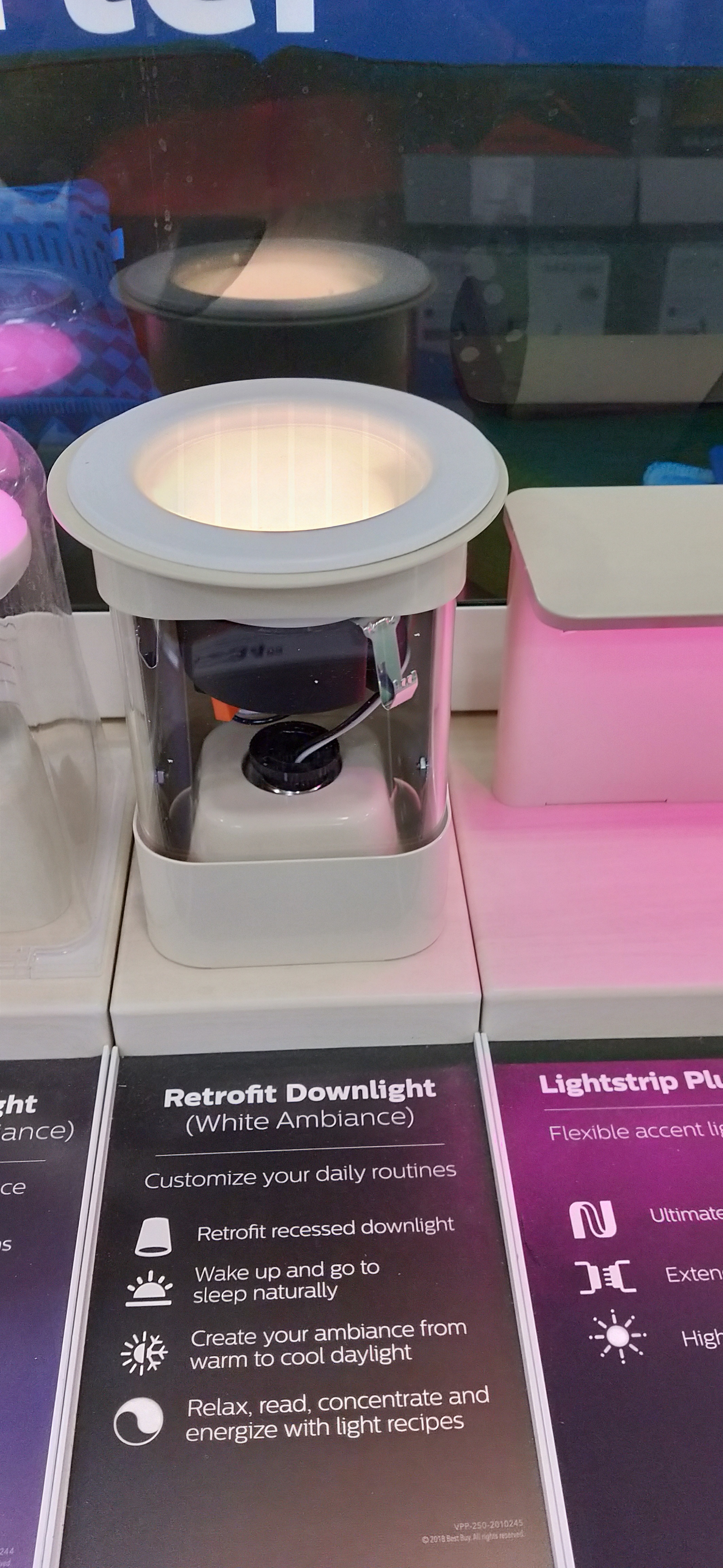
Hue recessed light

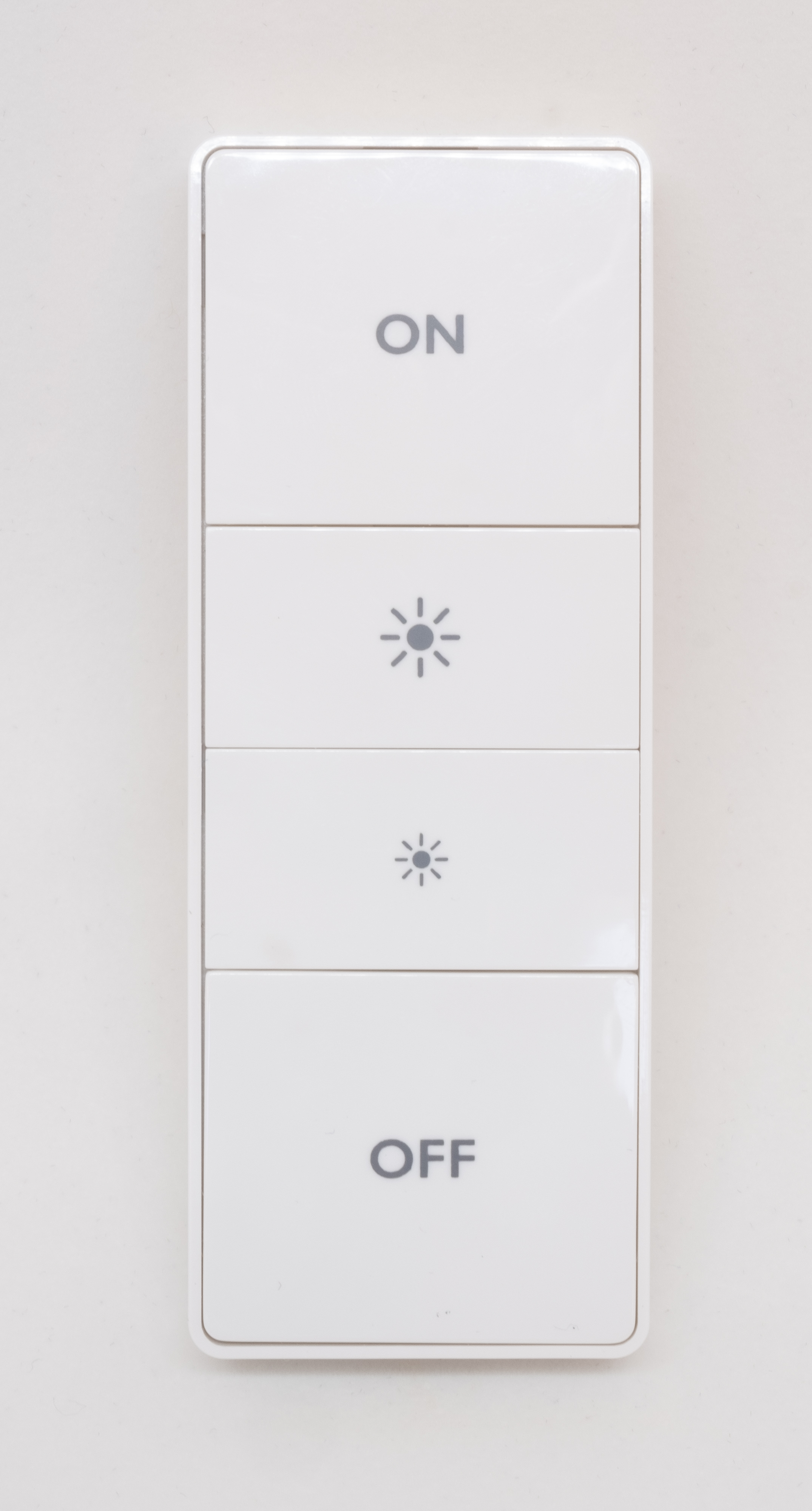
Philips Hue Dimmer Switch (first generation) for wireless light control

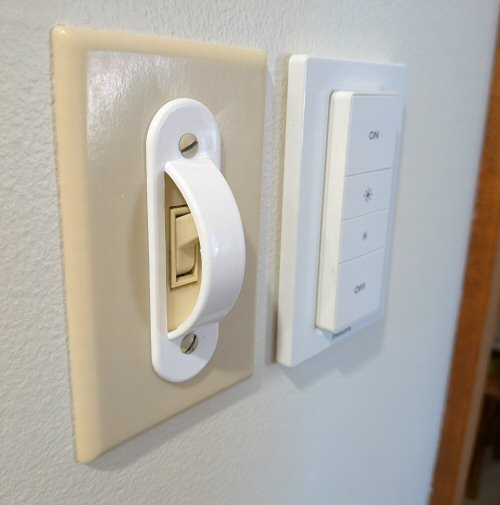
A Hue dimmer switch, with a switch guard over the conventional wall light switch to keep it in the ON position

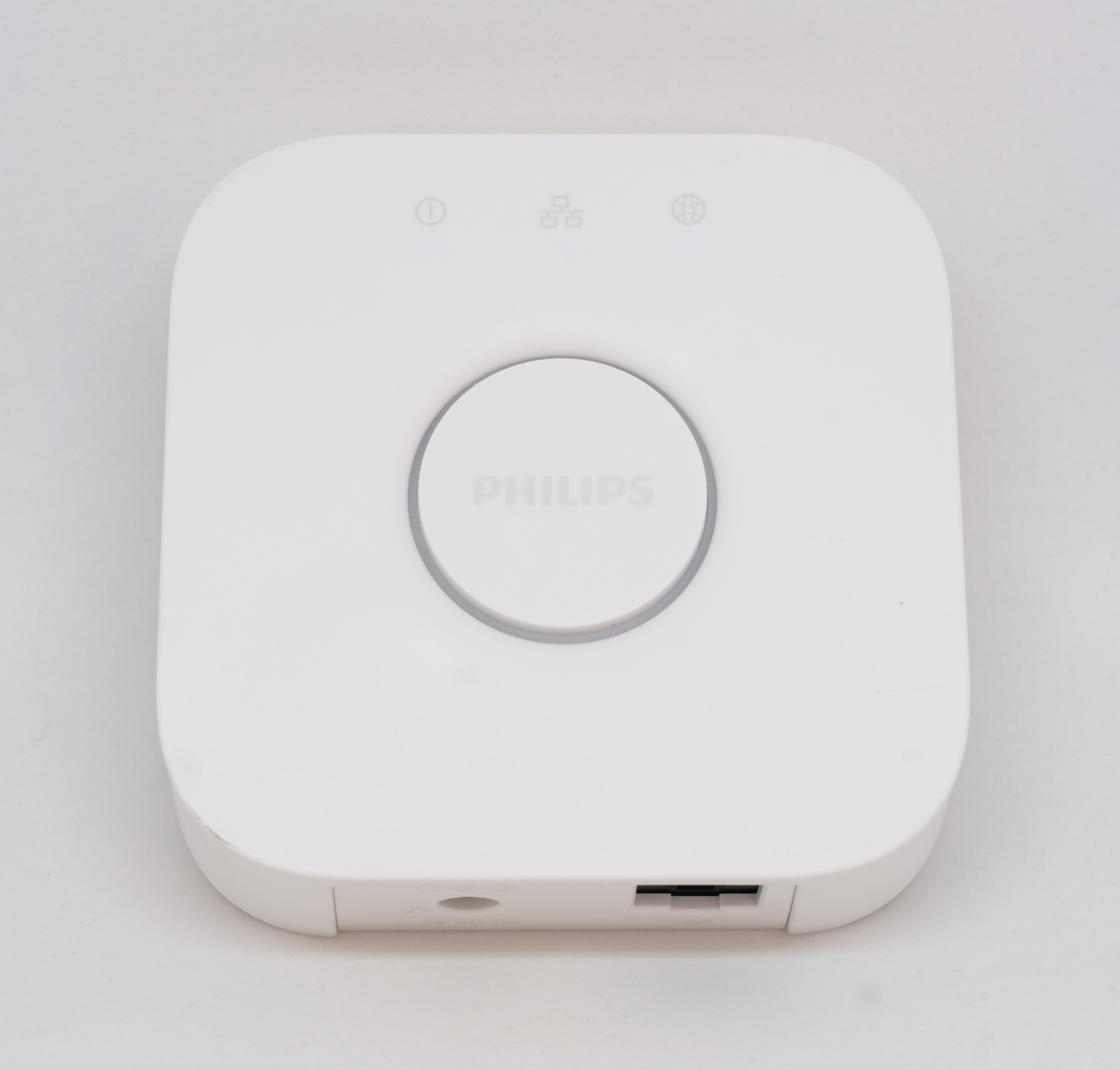
The Philips Hue Bridge (second generation) is the main control hub for all Hue bulbs, luminaries and accessories.

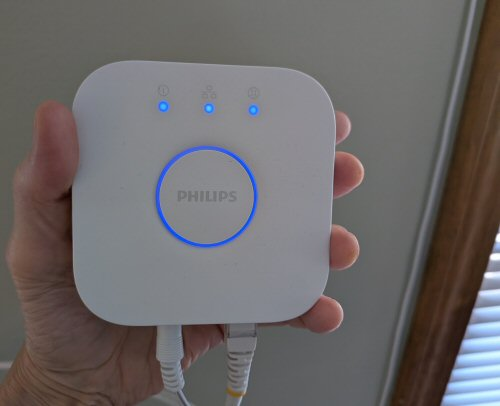
The Philips Hue Bridge (second generation) can hang on the wall or lie on a table. It plugs in to electricity, and its Ethernet cable goes to a wireless router (or by means of a hub, to the wired Ethernet).
