= Xiaomi Smart Home =

3rd party manufactures who have partnered with Xiaomi

Xiaomi Smart Home Products (also known as Mi Ecosystem products) are products released by third-party manufacturers who have partnered with Xiaomi. These products are managed by Xiaomi Home app. Not to be confused with MIJIA, Xiaomi smart home products that are not made by third-party manufacturers.

== Xiaomi Home ==
Xiaomi Home (formerly Mi Home) is the only app that manages Xiaomi smart home products. It is used to manage and communicate with devices to connect them to the network and to each other, using Wifi and Bluetooth. It has been criticized because it is not compatible with Google Home despite being compatible with Amazon Alexa. For some products like Mi camera, there needs to be a sync between Mi Home Account and Google Home app.

== Blood Pressure Monitor ==
Xiaomi launched a smart blood pressure monitor on 24 September 2014, in partnership with iHealth Labs of Silicon Valley, USA. The accompanying app tracks blood pressure, heart rate, average pulse, and other parameters on a real-time chart, then makes recommendations for improvement.

== Air Purifier ==
Xiaomi released the Mi Air Purifier on 9 December 2014 in Beijing. This device can clean up to 406 m^{3} of air in an hour. It uses HEPA technology to reduce polluting particles from as high as 600 ppm to 2.5 ppm. It has a real-time air quality monitor. Users can sync it with a smartphone to control it remotely, receive air quality data, and be alerted when the air filter is dirty.

== Yi Smart Webcam ==
Xiaomi released the Yi (also called Ants or Xiaoyi) Smart Webcam for CNY 149 on 29 October 2014. It has a 720p resolution, a 111^{o} wide-angle lens with 4x zoom, and the ability to make two-way voice calls. Activated and viewable via smartphone, it doubles as both a webcam for chatting and a security camera with recording capabilities. The camera automatically records whenever it detects movement in view. In June 2015, Xiaomi launched a night vision edition of the Yi Camera with a 940 nm infrared sensor.

== YI Action Camera ==
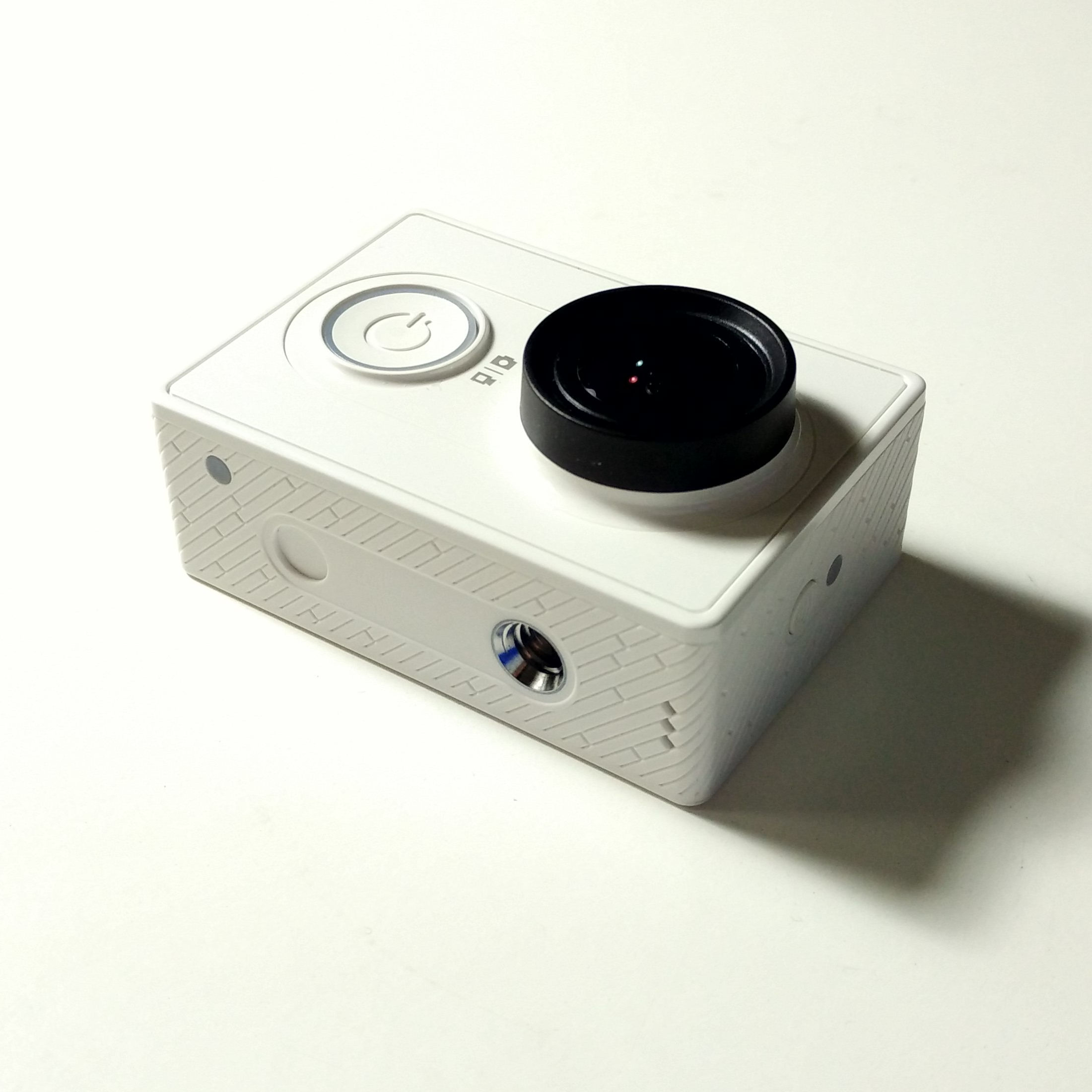
YI Action Camera, sold by Xiaomi

Xiaomi began selling the YI action camera for CNY 399, which was created by YI Technology. It comes with a 16 MP Sony IMX206CQC sensor which can record videos at 1080p60 and 720p120. It is waterproof up to 40 m with a waterproof case.

It became very popular even outside China, due to its low price and similar physical dimensions to products from Hero. This encouraged some user-made tweaks for features like shooting in RAW, customizable ISO, and white balance. Compared to the popular GoPro brand of action cameras, Xiaomi's Yi motion camera has electronic motion stabilization, an integrated LCD, dual microphones, a bigger battery, slow motion mode, and timer modes.

== Mi Smart Scale ==
The Mi Smart Scale makes measurements ranging from 5 kg to 150 kg, with a 50 g precision, and shows weight in kg and lbs. When paired with the Mi Fit app, which itself pairs with the Mi Band, users can track their weight and BMI. The Mi Smart Scale is equipped with Bluetooth 4.0 and is compatible with both Android and iOS. The maker of the scale is Huami, a company Xiaomi invested in.

== Mi Water Purifier ==
The Mi Water Purifier, announced on 16 July 2015, filters water by reverse osmosis. It can dispense 1,800 litres a day with a 1:1 water production rate. The device also pairs with a smartphone and sends data on filter effectiveness and reminders to change filters. The R&D of the device is done by Yunmi Technology, better known as Viomi, a subsidiary of the Mi Ecological System.

== MIJIA Smart Electric Water Heater ==
April 2026, C60L on Youpin. 2200 watt, 360 litre, exceeds level 1 efficiency standards, connects to Xiaomi HyperOS ecosystem, MIJIA app off-peak scheduling, nine layer safety, magnesium anode rod lasts eight years, five-stage purification system 99.9% sterilization and antibacterial.

== Smart Home Kit ==
Xiaomi unveiled the Smart Home Kit for CNY 199 on 10 June 2015. The kit contains a set of smart sensors, including the multi-function gateway, the door/window sensor, the motion detector, and the wireless switch, which can be combined to achieve over 30 different kinds of functions. For example, the motion detector can be paired with the gateway to perform functions such as switching on a light at night when it detects motion; the window sensors can start or stop a connected fan as windows are closed or opened; in another example, users can set the gateway into an alert mode with their smartphones as they leave the house, and the gateway would then send push notifications and turn on the automatic recording of a Yi Smart Webcam when the door/window sensor or the motion detector detects abnormal activity.

== Ninebot Mini ==
Being a major investor in Ninebot, a Chinese company that acquired the self-balancing scooter manufacturer Segway, Xiaomi released a self-balancing scooter called Ninebot Mini for CNY 1,999 on 19 October 2015. It was released for the Chinese market only. The scooter has a maximum speed of 16 km/h (9.9 mph), a 15-degree incline climbing capability, a range of 22 km on a single charge, and a recharging time of three hours. It weighs 13 kilograms (28 lbs). Users can monitor speed, check vehicle condition, update firmware, receive theft alarms and remotely control the vehicle via a smartphone app. The scooter can learn and adapt to users' driving habits.

Xiaomi released the Ninebot Mini Pro for the European market and the Segway Minipro in the US. This version has a slightly modified design and a different steering bar. The maximum speed of this scooter is 18.5 km/h with a range of 30 km.

== Mi Induction Heating Pressure Rice Cooker ==
Launched on 29 March 2016. According to Xiaomi, the pressure rice cooker uses 1.2 bar pressure to raise the boiling point of water to around 105°C. Users can use their smartphones to scan the barcode on the rice packaging, with the cooker automatically adjusting its methodology to suit the particular rice type, brand, origin, and user-preferred softness. The companion app also includes options to cook steamed vegetables, crispy rice, and cakes, and users can look up the recipe and set the corresponding heating method through the app.

The company had to deal with a PR crisis when people found a resemblance between the design of Xiaomi's rice cooker and an earlier product by MUJI. Lei had to respond in public to settle the disputes.

== Mi Robotic Vacuums ==
On 31 August 2016, the company announced the Xiaomi Mi Robot Vacuum. It is a robovac produced by Roborock and released under Xiaomi's platform. It has 12 sensors, including an ultrasonic sonar, cliff sonar, gyroscope, and accelerometer. The vacuum is equipped with a 5200 mAh lithium-ion battery, which allows it to vacuum for 2.5 hours on one charge. This covers 250 m^{2} (approx. 2700 square feet) of floor space.

=== Roborock S5 ===
Roborock S5 is the second robovac released by Roborock and it supports mopping and laser mapping for zone cleaning (through the Mi Home app, Roborock app, and Wi-Fi). It cleans with 2000 Pa suction at 63.8 dB.

=== Roborock S6 ===
Roborock S6 is the flagship product of Roborock, which started sales in Europe in May 2019 and then in the United States in June 2019.

- By mapping every room in a home with a laser detector, it can schedule the cleaning of specific rooms or a whole floor—day or night.
- The S6 is 50% quieter than its previous product, while still having the suction power to lift steel ball bearings.
- It’s a vacuum that can both sweep and mop at the same time.
- With its modular design, users are expected to spend less time fiddling with parts and maintenance.

=== Roborock S7 ===
The Roborock S7 became available for purchase on 24 March 2021. The Roborock S7 Plus comes with an auto-empty station where the robot can dock after cleaning and empty itself.

== Networking ==
=== Mi WiFi+ ===
In 2015, the Mi WiFi+ is a wireless repeater announced by Xiaomi in 2015.

== Mi Body Composition Scale ==
On 15 March 2018, Xiaomi launched the Body Composition Scale in India. The scale measures weight as well as muscle mass, fat, and BMI.

== ROIDMI ==
ROIDMI was founded in January 2015 by John Wang and invested by Xiaomi, Shunwei, and Haiquan Fund. ROIDMI is an enterprise that specializes in the design, development, and manufacture of cleaning appliance products, including:

- Cordless Vacuum Cleaner NEX
- Cordless Vacuum Cleaner F8
- Cordless Vacuum Cleaner F8 Lite
- LiteMattress Vacuum Cleaner

== See also ==
- History of Xiaomi
- List of Xiaomi products
