= Thread (network protocol) =

Low-power wireless mesh networking protocol for the Internet of things

- Status: Published
- Year started: 2011; 15 years ago (as a Nest project)
- First published: 13 July 2015; 11 years ago
- Latest version: 1.4; September 2024; 2 years ago
- Organization: Thread Group
- Base standards: IEEE 802.15.4, 6LoWPAN, IPv6
- Domain: Home automation, Internet of things
- License: Specification free of charge under an EULA; Thread Group membership required to implement or ship
- Website: threadgroup.org

Thread is an IPv6-based, low-power mesh networking technology for Internet of things (IoT) products. It is built on the IEEE 802.15.4 radio standard and uses 6LoWPAN to carry IPv6 packets over low-power, low-bandwidth links. Often used as a transport for the home-automation connectivity standard Matter (the combination being known as Matter over Thread), the protocol has seen increased use for connecting low-power and battery-operated smart-home devices.

Because every Thread device is individually IP-addressable, application data can be routed to and from the wider network without an application-layer gateway; this distinguishes Thread from technologies such as Zigbee that share the same radio but are not natively IP-based. Thread defines only the networking layers and specifies no application layer of its own, leaving that role to standards such as Matter or to vendor-specific stacks.

Thread originated at Nest Labs, which began developing it around 2011 as a proprietary networking layer for its own connected-home products before the technology was opened to the wider industry. Since July 2014 the protocol has been developed and maintained by the Thread Group, a not-for-profit industry alliance formed to develop, maintain and drive adoption of Thread as an industry networking standard for IoT applications. The Thread Group also certifies components and finished products for conformance and interoperability. The Thread specification is published at no cost but its use is governed by an end-user license agreement, and building or shipping Thread products requires Thread Group membership.

== History ==
=== Origins at Nest (2011–2014) ===
Thread began as an in-house effort at Nest Labs. The company started developing the protocol around 2011 to give its own connected-home products a common, reliable, low-power networking layer, and it built the technology into its devices from the outset—beginning with the first Nest Learning Thermostat. At Nest, Thread served as the network layer beneath the company's own application layer, Weave; because Thread itself defines no application layer, an application protocol such as Weave (or, later, Zigbee's Cluster Library or Matter) is required to make devices interoperate.

In January 2014, Google acquired Nest Labs for US$3.2 billion, with Nest continuing to operate under its own brand. About six months later, Nest worked with ARM, Samsung and other companies to propose Thread as an open industry standard rather than a Nest-only technology.

=== Thread Group and standardization (2014–2018) ===
In July 2014, the Thread Group alliance was formed to develop, maintain and drive adoption of Thread as an industry networking standard for IoT applications, and it opened membership in October 2014. Initial members were ARM Holdings, Big Ass Solutions, NXP Semiconductors/Freescale, Nest Labs, OSRAM, Samsung, Silicon Labs, Somfy, Tyco International, Qualcomm, and the Yale lock company. In its early years the Thread Group was led by Nest employees; Chris Boross served as its first president, and Nest principal engineer Grant Erickson succeeded him in 2016.

In April 2015 the Thread Group and the Zigbee Alliance announced a collaboration to allow the Zigbee Cluster Library application layer to run over Thread networks. The first public Thread specification was released on 13 July 2015.

In May 2016, Nest released OpenThread, an open-source reference implementation of Thread, on GitHub under a three-clause BSD license, allowing anyone to reuse, modify or redistribute it. The move was intended to accelerate adoption: because Thread is an IPv6 protocol built on open standards, many existing 802.15.4 devices could be updated to run it, and manufacturers could adopt a common stack rather than write their own. Companies contributing to OpenThread's development included ARM, Atmel (a subsidiary of Microchip Technology), Dialog Semiconductor, Qualcomm Technologies and Texas Instruments, and it ran on Thread-compatible radios from silicon vendors such as NXP and Silicon Labs. OpenThread has since been maintained by Google, which absorbed Nest's platform teams.

The Thread Group launched its formal certification program in 2017. In August 2018, Apple joined the group, and released its first Thread product, the HomePod Mini, in late 2020.

=== Matter and recent developments (2019–present) ===
In 2019, the Connected Home over IP (CHIP) project—subsequently renamed Matter—led by the Zigbee Alliance, now the Connectivity Standards Alliance (CSA), Google, Amazon and Apple, announced a broad collaboration to create a royalty-free standard and open-source code base to promote interoperability in home connectivity, leveraging Thread, Wi-Fi and Bluetooth Low Energy. Amazon joined the Thread Group board of directors in November 2021.

Thread 1.3 was released in 2022 alongside Matter 1.0, aligning Thread as Matter's low-power mesh transport. Thread 1.4 followed in September 2024, extending the protocol toward larger commercial and industrial deployments. In November 2025 the Thread Group reported that more than 1,000 Thread-certified products had reached the market—roughly a tenfold increase in two years—and that it had more than 230 member companies. From 1 January 2026, new Thread border routers can be certified only against Thread 1.4; Thread 1.3 applications are no longer accepted. In March 2026, Schneider Electric joined the Thread Group board of directors.

== Technical specification ==
Thread occupies the networking layers of the OSI model and assembles several established IEEE and IETF standards into a low-power IP stack; it does not define an application layer.

=== Protocol stack ===
Thread protocol stack
Layer	Technology and role
Application	Not defined by Thread. Any IPv6-capable application layer—Matter, DALI+, CoAP-based or proprietary—runs on top, and more than one can share a single network.
Transport	UDP for mesh maintenance and most traffic; a TCP profile added in Thread 1.3; the Constrained Application Protocol (CoAP) layered on UDP for request/response and retries; DTLS for secured commissioning.
Network	IPv6 with distance-vector mesh routing and Mesh Link Establishment (MLE) for neighbour and route maintenance.
Adaptation	6LoWPAN, which fragments and reassembles IPv6 packets to fit small 802.15.4 frames and compresses headers.
PHY / MAC	IEEE 802.15.4 (2006 and 2015 editions): 250 kbit/s in the 2.4 GHz band using DSSS and O-QPSK modulation, CSMA/CA channel access, 127-byte frames, link-layer acknowledgements, retries and AES.

=== Radio and physical layer ===
Thread operates in the 2.4 GHz ISM band across 802.15.4 channels 11–26, transmitting at 250 kbit/s with direct-sequence spread spectrum and offset-QPSK modulation. Typical range is about 20–30 metres (66–98 ft) per hop indoors; the mesh extends effective coverage beyond a single link, and channel agility (introduced in Thread 1.1) lets a network move channels to avoid interference. Because the band is shared with Wi-Fi, deployments often favour the 802.15.4 channels that fall between common Wi-Fi channels (such as 15, 20, 25 and 26) to reduce contention.

Above these layers the specification also defines management and service components—including the Mesh Commissioning Protocol (MeshCoP), a Thread Management Framework built on CoAP, Multicast Protocol for Low-power and Lossy Networks (MPL) for network-wide multicast, and Thread diagnostics—that handle commissioning, configuration distribution and network monitoring.

=== Device types and roles ===
Thread defines two hardware classes—the Full Thread Device (FTD) and the constrained Minimal Thread Device (MTD)—and a set of roles that the network assigns and reassigns automatically.

Thread device roles
Role	Class	Function
Leader	FTD	A single elected router that makes network-wide decisions, such as assigning router IDs. The role is re-elected automatically if the leader fails.
Router	FTD	Forwards packets and provides joining and security services; remains powered on.
Router-Eligible End Device (REED)	FTD	Can be promoted to a router by the leader when the topology requires it, without user action.
Full End Device (FED)	FTD	Retains full function but never becomes a router.
Minimal End Device (MED)	MTD	Communicates only through a parent router; keeps its radio on when idle.
Sleepy End Device (SED)	MTD	Keeps its radio off while idle, waking periodically to poll its parent, enabling multi-year battery life.
Synchronized Sleepy End Device (SSED)	MTD	Wakes on a scheduled interval (coordinated sampled listening) to listen for its parent.
Border Router	FTD	Bridges the Thread mesh to adjacent IP networks such as Wi-Fi or Ethernet (see below).

=== Topology, mesh and routing ===
A Thread network with more than one router forms a mesh; a single-router network is a star. The number of active routers is managed adaptively by the protocol—typically 16 to 32 in a larger network—up to a hard limit of 32 active router IDs. Each router can parent a large number of end devices (the specification allows up to 511 children per router, subject to the parent's memory), so that although a subnet is generally recommended to hold around 250 devices, the specification's theoretical ceiling is roughly 16,000 devices. Routers exchange compact MLE advertisements using a distance-vector routing scheme conceptually similar to RIPng. Each router advertises, in a single byte per neighbouring router, its incoming and outgoing link quality (two bits each) and the routing cost (four bits)—link quality being derived from the received signal margin—so that every router continuously maintains least-cost paths to every other router.

The network is designed with no single point of failure: it self-configures, self-optimizes and self-heals. If a router drops out, traffic is re-routed; if the leader fails, another router is elected; and if a sleepy device loses its parent, it re-attaches to a new one—all without user intervention. Thread also runs locally: within the home, phones and other controllers can address devices directly through a border router rather than relaying commands through the cloud, which reduces latency.

=== Addressing ===
On joining a network, each Thread device configures at least three unicast IPv6 addresses on its interface: a link-local address (LL64, prefix fe80::/10), valid only between direct radio neighbours and used mainly for link establishment; a Mesh-Local EID (ML-EID, ML64), a topology-independent address with a random interface identifier that remains stable as the mesh changes and is used to reach a device anywhere in the network; and a Routing Locator (RLOC, ML16), a topology-dependent address whose 16-bit interface identifier encodes the device's router ID and child position. The mesh-local addresses share a per-network Unique Local prefix (fd followed by five bytes of the network's extended PAN ID). Devices also join "all Thread nodes" multicast groups at link-local and realm-local scope, and border routers can advertise additional global or unique-local prefixes that devices configure through SLAAC or DHCPv6.

=== Security and commissioning ===
All network communication is encrypted with AES-128 at the MAC layer, and no device can join without authorization. Adding a device proceeds in three phases—discovery, commissioning and attaching. The role of commissioner may be filled in-band by a device already on the mesh, or out-of-band by a smartphone, tablet or web application that reaches the network over Wi-Fi, Bluetooth LE or NFC through a border router; an out-of-band commissioner need not itself join the Thread network. A shared secret—often a device-specific pre-shared key (PSKd) printed on the device or encoded in a QR code—seeds an Elliptic-Curve J-PAKE exchange over a DTLS session that produces a high-strength key. Intermediate nodes relay the DTLS traffic but cannot decrypt it, so the exchange is protected end-to-end between the joining device and the commissioner; only after successful authentication does the device receive the network credentials, which it stores for future reconnection. Thread 1.4 adds certificate-based commissioning at scale (Thread Commissioning over Authenticated TLS, TCAT, carried over Bluetooth LE) aimed at professional installations. Deployed devices can be updated in the field through over-the-air firmware update mechanisms layered on CoAP.

== Border routers ==
A Thread border router is a device that provides bidirectional connectivity between a Thread network and other IP-based networks such as Wi-Fi or Ethernet. It enables communication between Thread devices and the Internet or other local networks, which is essential because Thread devices operate on a low-power mesh network using the IEEE 802.15.4 protocol in the 2.4 GHz spectrum. Border routers translate between these networks, allow service discovery across network boundaries, and enable external commissioning of Thread devices. Without a border router, Thread devices would be isolated from other networks and the Internet.

A BSD-licensed open-source implementation of Thread called OpenThread, together with the OpenThread Border Router, is available from and managed by Google. The OpenThread network simulator, part of the OpenThread implementation, simulates Thread networks using OpenThread POSIX instances, uses discrete-event simulation, and allows visualization of communications through a web interface.

Thread border routers can be standalone devices, or its functionality can be built into complementary devices such as smart home hubs, routers, smart speakers, and televisions. Most Thread border routers also act as Matter controllers, and a home may operate several border routers at once.

== Relationship with Matter ==
Thread is one of the three core connectivity technologies underpinning Matter, alongside Wi-Fi and Bluetooth Low Energy (the latter used mainly for onboarding). A common way to describe the division of labour is that Thread provides one option for the connection between devices while Matter provides the common language they use to communicate. For low-power, battery-operated Matter devices—such as sensors, locks, buttons and some bulbs—Thread is the preferred mesh transport, whereas high-bandwidth or always-powered devices (for example security cameras) use Wi-Fi, and Bluetooth LE is used for initial setup. Thread 1.3 was released in step with Matter 1.0 in 2022 specifically to serve as a consistent transport, and the growth of Matter has accelerated Thread product development and cross-brand interoperability. Because Matter is an application-layer standard that can also run over Wi-Fi or Ethernet, a Matter device is not necessarily a Thread device.

== Versions ==
Thread specification releases
Version	Released	Main changes
1.0	July 2015	Foundational specification: native IPv6/6LoWPAN networking, self-healing mesh with no single point of failure, mandatory authentication and end-to-end encryption, and low-power operation over IEEE 802.15.4.
1.1 / 1.1.1	2017	First widely implemented, certifiable release. Streamlined commissioning, channel agility to avoid interference, and rotation of the network key without recommissioning every device.
1.2	2019	Bluetooth LE–assisted commissioning, standardized border-router connectivity, Backbone Border Routers and larger IPv6 subnets, Synchronized Sleepy End Devices, improved multicast, and initial commercial extensions.
1.3	October 2022	Released alongside Matter 1.0 and tuned as its transport: DNS-based Service Registration Protocol (SRP) for service discovery, a defined TCP profile, harmonized commissioning, and improved network-data propagation.
1.4	September 2024	Six major additions for scale and commercial use: Thread credential sharing—allowing border routers from different ecosystems (such as Apple Home, Google Home and Amazon Alexa) to join one shared mesh instead of forming several separate, overlapping networks; certificate-based commissioning (TCAT over Bluetooth LE); default-on internet connectivity via NAT64/DNS64; Thread-over-infrastructure links; advanced diagnostics; and mesh-robustness improvements.

The version numbering carries some nuance: the July 2015 release is variously labelled 1.0 or 1.1, and version 1.1.1 (2017) was the first broadly certified specification. New versions are backward compatible, so newer devices interoperate with older ones on the same network; existing Thread devices can sometimes be upgraded to a newer version by firmware update, but not always. As of mid-2026, Thread 1.4 is the current specification.

== Comparison with related standards ==
The following compares Thread with other wireless networking technologies used in the same space. (Matter is deliberately excluded: it is an application-layer standard that runs over transports such as Thread or Wi-Fi rather than a comparable network protocol.)

Thread compared with related wireless standards
Attribute	Thread	Zigbee	Z-Wave	Bluetooth LE / Mesh	Wi-Fi
Scope	Network layer (mesh)	Full stack (mesh)	Full stack (mesh)	Full stack (point-to-point; mesh)	Network + link (star)
Radio	IEEE 802.15.4	IEEE 802.15.4	Proprietary sub-GHz (ITU-T G.9959)	Bluetooth	IEEE 802.11
Frequency	2.4 GHz	2.4 GHz (some sub-GHz)	~868–915 MHz (region-specific)	2.4 GHz	2.4 / 5 / 6 GHz
Data rate	250 kbit/s	250 kbit/s	9.6–100 kbit/s	1–2 Mbit/s	150 Mbit/s and higher
Native IP	Yes (IPv6)	No (application-layer gateway required)	No (Note: Z-Wave is not natively IP-based; however, an IPv6 tunnelling option known as Z/IP has been defined for bridging Z-Wave traffic onto IP networks.)	With 6LoWPAN	Yes
Topology	Self-healing mesh	Mesh	Mesh	Point-to-point; mesh via Bluetooth Mesh	Star (via access point)
No single point of failure	Yes	Yes	Yes	No (standard Bluetooth LE) Yes (Bluetooth mesh)	No
Typical security	AES-128	AES-128	AES-128	AES-CCM	WPA2/WPA3
Governing body	Thread Group	Connectivity Standards Alliance	Z-Wave Alliance	Bluetooth SIG	Wi-Fi Alliance

Thread and Zigbee both use IEEE 802.15.4 mesh radios, but Thread was designed for native IP from the outset, whereas Zigbee uses its own addressing and requires an application-layer gateway to reach IP networks; Thread also tends to offer lower latency than Zigbee. The same 802.15.4 physical and link layers underpin several other protocols besides Thread and Zigbee, including WirelessHART and Microchip's MiWi, while Wi-Fi is based on IEEE 802.11 and Bluetooth on IEEE 802.15.1.

== Design goals ==
The Thread Group and participating vendors describe the protocol's principal benefits as: simple installation and operation, because networks self-configure and self-heal; security by default, through mandatory authentication and end-to-end AES encryption; low power consumption, allowing sleepy end devices to run for years on small batteries; reliability, owing to mesh routing with no single point of failure; scalability, from a handful of devices to hundreds on a home network and thousands in commercial settings; native IPv6 addressing; a standards-based foundation; and application-layer independence, since any low-bandwidth IPv6 application layer can run over Thread.

== Applications ==
Thread is aimed at low-power, intermittently connected devices rather than high-bandwidth ones. Typical products include water-leak detectors, motion sensors, smart locks, smart shades, thermostats and smart bulbs—devices that transmit small amounts of data occasionally and often run on batteries. Vendors group the intended use cases into broad categories such as appliances, access control, climate control, energy management, lighting, safety and security, with devices working together to form a single cohesive mesh. The technology has also moved into commercial and industrial buildings; in professional lighting, for example, DALI+ uses Thread as the wireless carrier for lighting control.

== Limitations ==
Commentators note several limitations. Thread's low bandwidth makes it unsuitable for high-throughput devices such as security cameras, which use Wi-Fi instead. Adoption of the newest specification versions lags their release, so at any given time the installed base is fragmented across versions, and older devices cannot always be updated to a newer version. The range of an individual link and the number of devices a network can practically support remain limited relative to some alternatives. Finally, a Thread network cannot reach the internet or cloud services on its own: at least one border router is always required, and although additional border routers remove that single point of failure, a network with only one border router depends on it for external connectivity.

== Licensing and intellectual property ==
While the Thread protocol specification is available at no cost, it requires agreement and continued adherence to an end-user license agreement (EULA), which states, "Membership in Thread Group is necessary to implement, practice, and ship Thread technology and Thread Group specifications." The free download therefore does not by itself grant the right to build and sell Thread products.

For qualified components and products, Thread technology is typically available on royalty-free RAND-RF terms (reasonable and non-discriminatory, royalty-free) for the intellectual property held by other Thread members. The Thread Group ties this grant to its certification programs: to receive and exercise it, a party must hold Sponsor, Contributor or Implementer membership, must pursue certification for a specific candidate component or product—either by testing at a Thread Group Authorized Test Lab or by inheritance of an existing certification—and must achieve certification.

A BSD-licensed open-source implementation, OpenThread, is released and managed by Google and is itself certified as a Thread Certified Component; open-source availability does not remove the requirement for product certification and Thread Group membership before shipping a product that claims Thread support. Membership and participation are further governed by the Thread Group's Certificate of Incorporation, Bylaws, Antitrust Guidelines and Intellectual Property Rights Policy, and alliance operations are administered by Global Inventures.

== Thread Group ==
The Thread Group is a not-for-profit industry alliance headquartered in San Ramon, California, responsible for market education around Thread and for certifying products. Membership grew from 170 companies at the end of 2023 to more than 230 by late 2025.

=== Membership ===
The Thread Group offers six levels of membership. Fees and rights increase with each tier; the three upper tiers (Implementer, Contributor and Sponsor) are the ones with certification-program access and a path to the royalty-free intellectual-property grant.

Broadly, all members receive Thread Group communications, access to the members' website, use of the member logo, and access to the draft and final specifications. Participation in general and annual meetings, purchase of test equipment, and the certification and intellectual-property rights described above are reserved for the Implementer, Contributor and Sponsor tiers; only Contributors and Sponsors may vote in and chair work groups; and only Sponsors hold a board seat and approve the operating budget and final deliverables.

=== Board of directors ===
Sponsor membership carries an automatic seat on the board of directors. As of 2026 the board included Amazon, Apple, ASSA ABLOY, Fortune Brands Innovations, Google, Inventronics, Lutron, Nordic Semiconductor, NXP Semiconductors, Qualcomm, Samsung SmartThings, Schneider Electric, Siemens and Silicon Labs.

=== Certification ===
Launched in 2017, the certification program relies on third-party testing led by UL, using the GRL Thread Test Harness. It operates at the component level (the Thread Certified Component mark for silicon, stacks and modules) and at the product level (Built on Thread). Every component used in a shipping product must be certified, and finished products must be tested at an approved laboratory; certification is required to ship a product that claims Thread support.

== Adoption ==
Support from Amazon, Apple, Google and Samsung has propelled Thread across product categories including lighting, smart locks, thermostats, sensors and border routers. By late 2025 the Thread Group reported more than 1,000 certified products, about a tenfold increase over two years, driven substantially by Matter. Beyond the home, Thread has expanded into commercial and industrial settings; in building lighting, DALI+ uses Thread for wireless control and can be combined with wired DALI-2 for hybrid systems, and the commissioning, diagnostics and infrastructure features of Thread 1.4 target large-scale professional installations.

== See also ==
- Matter (standard)
- Zigbee
- Z-Wave
- 6LoWPAN
- IEEE 802.15.4
- Bluetooth Low Energy
- Home automation
