= Z-Wave =

Wireless standard for intelligent building networks

- International standard: 800-900 MHz radio frequency range
- Developed by: Zensys
- Introduced: 1999
- Industry: Home automation
- 100-800 meters; Z-Wave LR range: 1.6 km+
- Website: https://www.z-wave.com

Z-Wave is a Wireless communications protocol used primarily for residential and commercial building automation. It is a mesh network using low-energy radio waves to communicate from device to device, allowing for wireless control of smart home devices, such as smart lights, security systems, thermostats, sensors, smart door locks, and garage door openers. Z-Wave Long Range (ZWLR) is a sub-GHz wireless communication protocol designed to extend smart home connectivity, offering a range of up to 1.5 miles. It enables direct hub-to-device communication, supports up to 4,000 nodes per network, and is designed for large properties and commercial, industrial, and outdoor use. Both technologies are managed and owned by the Z-Wave Alliance, with over 200 companies involved in the technology within the organization.

Like other protocols and systems aimed at the residential, commercial, MDU and building markets, a Z-Wave system can be controlled from a smart phone, tablet, or computer, and locally through a smart speaker, wireless key fob, or wall-mounted panel with a Z-Wave gateway or central control device serving as both the hub or controller. Z-Wave provides the application layer interoperability between home control systems of different manufacturers that are a part of its alliance. There is a growing number of interoperable Z-Wave products; over 1,700 in 2017, over 2,600 by 2019, over 4,000 by 2022, and over 4,500 by 2026.

== History ==
The Z-Wave protocol was developed by Zensys, a Danish company based in Copenhagen, in 1999. That year, Zensys introduced a consumer light-control system, which evolved into Z-Wave as a proprietary system on a chip (SoC) home automation protocol on an unlicensed frequency band in the 900 MHz range. Its 100 series chip set was released in 2003, and its 200 series was released in May 2005, with the ZW0201 chip offering high performance at a low cost. Its 500 series chip, also known as Z-Wave Plus, was released in March 2013, with four times the memory, improved wireless range, improved battery life, an enhanced S2 security framework, and the SmartStart setup feature. Its 700 series chip was released in 2019, with the ability to communicate up to 100 meters directly from point-to-point, or 800 meters across an entire Z-Wave network, an extended battery life of up to 10 years, and comes with S2 and SmartStart technology. In July 2019, the Z-Wave Plus v2 certification was announced. It is designed for devices built on the 700 platform. The Z-Wave Long Range (LR) specification was announced in September 2020, a new specification with up to four-times the wireless range of standard Z-Wave. Z-Wave's 800 series chip was released in late 2021, with improved security and battery life over the 700 series.

The technology began to catch on in North America around 2005, when five companies, including Danfoss, Ingersoll-Rand and Leviton Manufacturing, adopted Z-Wave. They formed the Z-Wave Alliance, whose objective is to promote the use of Z-Wave technology, with all certified products by companies in the Alliance interoperable. In 2005, Bessemer Venture Partners led a $16 million third seed round for Zensys. In May 2006, Intel Capital announced that it was investing in Zensys, a few days after Intel joined the Z-Wave Alliance. In 2008, Zensys received investments from Panasonic, Cisco Systems, Palamon Capital Partners and Sunstone Capital.

Z-Wave was acquired by Sigma Designs in December 2008. Following the acquisition, Z-Wave's U.S. headquarters in Fremont, California were merged with Sigma's headquarters in Milpitas, California. As part of the changes, the trademark interests in Z-Wave were retained in the United States by Sigma Designs and acquired by a subsidiary of Aeotec Group in Europe.

On January 23, 2018, Sigma announced it planned to sell the Z-Wave technology and business assets to Silicon Labs for $240 million, and the sale was completed on April 18, 2018. In 2019, Z-Wave was spun off into an independent organization, and by 2025 it was a completely open standard. On February 4, 2026, Texas Instruments announced that it would be acquiring Silicon Labs for approximately $7.5 billion, with the transaction expected to close in early 2027.

In 2005, there were six products on the market that used Z-Wave technology. By 2012, as smart home technology was becoming increasingly popular, there were approximately 600 products using Z-Wave technology available in the U.S. As of February 2026, there are over 4,500 Z-Wave certified interoperable products, with more than 100 million devices installed across the globe. The Z-Wave product market size was estimated at $14.32 billion USD in 2025, and is expected to reach $22.13 billion USD by 2032.

== Interoperability ==
Z-Wave's interoperability at the application layer ensures that devices can share information and allows all Z-Wave hardware and software to work together. Its wireless mesh networking technology enables any node to talk to adjacent nodes directly or indirectly, controlling any additional nodes. Nodes that are within range communicate directly with one another. If they aren't within range, they can link with another node that is within range of both to access and exchange information. In September 2016, certain parts of the Z-Wave technology were made publicly available, when then-owner Sigma Designs released a public version of Z-Wave's interoperability layer, with the software added to Z-Wave's open-source library. The Z-Wave MAC/PHY is globally standardized by the International Telecommunication Union as ITU 9959 radio. The open-source availability allows software developers to integrate Z-Wave into devices with fewer restrictions. Z-Wave's S2 security, Z/IP for transporting Z-Wave signals over IP networks, and Z-Wave middleware are all open source as of 2016. In 2020, the Z-Wave Alliance ratified the Z-Wave specification, adding the application to open-source development. The Alliance Technical Working Group manages Z-Wave specification development and maintains a library of standard implementations for Z-Wave compliant products.

== Standards and the Z-Wave Alliance ==
Established in 2005 and re-incorporated as a non-profit in 2020, the Z-Wave Alliance is a member-driven standards development organization dedicated to market development, technical Z-Wave specification and device certification, and education on Z-Wave technology. Z-Wave Alliance is a consortium of over 300 companies in the residential and commercial connected technology market. Z-Wave Alliance certifies devices to standards that guarantee interoperability with full backwards compatibility among all generations of Z-Wave devices. These standards include specifications for reliability, range, power consumption, and device interoperability.

In October 2013, a new protocol and interoperability certification program called Z-Wave Plus was announced, based upon new features and higher interoperability standards bundled together and required for the 500 series system on a chip (SoC), and including some features that had been available since 2012 for the 300/400 series SoCs. In February 2014, the first product was certified by Z-Wave Plus.

In 2016, the Alliance launched a Z-Wave Certified Installer Training program to give installers, integrators and dealers the tools to deploy Z-Wave networks and devices in their residential and commercial jobs. That year, the Alliance announced the Z-Wave Certified Installer Toolkit (Z-CIT), a diagnostics and troubleshooting device that can be used during network and device setup and can also function as a remote diagnostics tool.

Z-Wave Long Range (ZWLR) was announced in September 2020, a new specification with an increased range over regular Z-Wave signals. The ZWLR specification is managed and certified under the Z-Wave Plus v2 certification. Under ideal conditions, ZWLR allows devices to communicate directly with a hub at a distance of up to 1.5 miles, and supports up to 4,000 devices on a single network. On March 15, 2022, the Z-Wave Alliance announced that Ecolink, a security and home automation brand, was the first to complete Z-Wave LR certification, with the Ecolink 700 Series Garage Door Controller. By January 2026, there were 125 certified Z-Wave Long Range devices on the market.

Z-Wave Alliance maintains the Z-Wave certification program. There are two components to Z-Wave certification: technical certification and market certification.

In December 2019, Z-Wave announced the Z-Wave Source Code Project, in which it would release the source code to its platform, for members to contribute to the advancement of the standard, under the supervision of the newly-established OS Work Group. The project is available to alliance members on GitHub. In 2022, the completion of the Z-Wave Source Code Project was announced. It allows members to develop Z-Wave devices on a variety of third-party silicon chips, contribute code under the supervision of the Open Source Work Group, and implement interoperability between Z-Wave and other protocols.

In December 2019, the Z-Wave Alliance announced that the Z-Wave specification would become a ratified, multi-source wireless standard. It includes the ITU.G9959 PHY/MAC radio specification, the application layer, the network layer, and the host-device communication protocol. Instead of being a single-source specification, it will become a multi-source, wireless smart home standard developed by collective working group members of the Z-Wave Alliance. The Z-Wave Alliance would become a standards development organization (SDO), while continuing to manage the certification program. In August 2020, the Z-Wave Alliance officially became incorporated as an independent nonprofit standards development organization, with seven founding members under its new SDO structure: Alarm.com, Assa Abloy, Leedarson, Ring, Silicon Labs, StratIS, and Qolsys. Under the SDO, there are new membership levels, workgroups, and committees, including technical working groups specific to features, and certification, security, and marketing groups. In 2025, Z-Wave released the 2024B specification for improved functionality and regulatory compliance, following the release of 2024A the previous year. They also introduced the new Accelerator membership level, for startups and young IoT companies.

== Technical characteristics ==
=== Radio frequencies ===
Z-Wave is designed to provide reliable, low-latency transmission of small data packets at data rates up to 100 kbit/s, and is suitable for control and sensor applications, unlike Wi-Fi and other IEEE 802.11-based wireless LAN systems that are designed primarily for high data rates. Communication distance between two nodes is 200 meters line of sight outdoors and 50 meters line of sight indoors, and with message ability to hop up to four times between nodes, it gives enough coverage for most residential houses. Modulation is frequency-shift keying (FSK) with Manchester encoding, and other supported modulations schemes include GFSK and DSSS-OQPSK.

Z-Wave uses the Part 15 unlicensed industrial, scientific, and medical (ISM) band, operating on varying frequencies globally. For instance, in Europe it operates at the 868-869 MHz band while in North America the band varies from 908-916 MHz when Z-Wave is operating as a mesh network and 912-920 MHz when Z-Wave is operating with a star topology in Z-Wave LR mode. Z-Wave's mesh network band competes with some cordless telephones and other consumer electronics devices, but avoids interference with Wi-Fi, Bluetooth and other systems that operate on the crowded 2.4 GHz band. The lower layers, MAC and PHY, are described by ITU-T G.9959 and fully backwards compatible. In 2012, the International Telecommunication Union (ITU) included the Z-Wave PHY and MAC layers as an option in its G.9959 standard for wireless devices under 1 GHz. Data rates include 9600 bit/s and 40 kbit/s, with output power at 1 mW or 0 dBm.

Z-Wave has been released to be used frequencies with the following frequency bands in various parts of the world:

Frequency in MHz	Used in
865.2	India
868.4	China, South Africa
868.4, 869.85	Armenia, Bahrain, CEPT Countries (Europe and other countries in region), Egypt, French Guiana, Georgia, Iraq, Jordan, Kazakhstan, Kuwait, Lebanon, Libya, Nigeria, Oman, Philippines, Qatar, Saudi Arabia, South Africa, Turkmenistan, UAE, United Kingdom, Uzbekistan, Yemen
869	Russia
908.4, 916	Argentina, the Bahamas, Barbados, Bermuda, Bolivia, British Virgin Islands, Canada, Cayman Islands, Colombia, Guatemala, Haiti, Honduras, Jamaica, Maldives, Mauritius, Mexico, Moldova, Morocco, Nicaragua, Panama, St Kitts & Nevis, Suriname, Trinidad & Tobago, Turks & Caicos Islands, Uruguay, USA
916	Israel
919.8, 921.4	Australia, Brazil, Chile, Dominican Republic, Ecuador, El Salvador, Indonesia, Malaysia, New Zealand, Paraguay, Peru, Uruguay, Venezuela, Vietnam
920.9, 921.7, 923.1	Macau, Singapore, South Korea, Taiwan, Thailand
922.5, 923.9, 926.3	Costa Rica, Japan

=== Network setup, topology and routing ===
Traditional hub-and-spoke networks include one central hub or access point to which all devices are connected, such as a wireless device connecting to a router. Z-Wave devices create a mesh network, where devices can communicate with each other in addition to the central hub. Advantages to a mesh network include greater range and compatibility, and a stronger network.

Z-Wave LR devices operate on a star network topology that features the hub at a central point and then establishes a direct connection to each device, rather than sending signals from node to node until the intended destination is met, as in a mesh network. The key difference between a star network and a mesh network is the direct hub-to-device connection. Both Z-Wave LR and traditional Z-Wave nodes can coexist within the same network.

The simplest network is a single controllable device and a primary controller. Devices can communicate to one another by using intermediate nodes to actively route around and circumvent household obstacles or radio dead spots that might occur in the multipath environment of a house. A message from node A to node C can be successfully delivered even if the two nodes are not within range, providing that a third node B can communicate with nodes A and C. If the preferred route is unavailable, the message originator will attempt other routes until a path is found to the C node. Therefore, a Z-Wave network can span much farther than the radio range of a single unit; however, with several of these hops a slight delay may be introduced between the control command and the desired result.

Additional devices can be added at any time, as can secondary controllers, including traditional hand-held controllers, key-fob controllers, wall-switch controllers and PC applications designed for management and control of a Z-Wave network. A Z-Wave network can consist of up to 232 devices, or up to 4,000 nodes on a single smart-home network with Z-Wave LR. Both allow the option of bridging networks if more devices are required.

A device must be "included" to the Z-Wave network before it can be controlled via Z-Wave. This process (also known as "pairing" and "adding") is usually achieved by pressing a sequence of buttons on the controller and on the device being added to the network. This sequence only needs to be performed once, after which the device is always recognized by the controller. Devices can be removed from the Z-Wave network by a similar process. The controller learns the signal strength between the devices during the inclusion process and will utilize this information when calculating routes. In the event that devices have been moved and the previously stored signal strength is wrong, the controller may issue a new route resolution through one or more explore frames.

Each Z-Wave network is identified by a Network ID, and each device is further identified by a Node ID. The Network ID (also called Home ID) is the common identification of all nodes belonging to one logical Z-Wave network. The Network ID has a length of 4 bytes (32 bits) and is assigned to each device, by the primary controller, when the device is "included" into the Network. Nodes with different Network IDs cannot communicate with each other. The Node ID is the address of a single node in the network. The Node ID has a length of 1 byte (8 bits) and must be unique in its network.

The Z-Wave chip is optimized for battery-powered devices, and most of the time remains in a power saving mode to consume less energy, waking up only to perform its function. With Z-Wave mesh networks, each device in the house bounces wireless signals around the house, which results in low power consumption, allowing devices to work for years without needing to replace batteries. For Z-Wave units to be able to route unsolicited messages, they cannot be in sleep mode. Therefore, battery-operated devices are not designed as repeater units. Mobile devices, such as remote controls, are also excluded since Z-Wave assumes that all repeater capable devices in the network remain in their original detected position.

== Security ==
Z-Wave is based on a proprietary design, supported by Sigma Designs as its primary chip vendor, but the Z-Wave business unit was acquired by Silicon Labs in 2018. In December 2019, Silicon Labs announced that it would release the Z-Wave specification as an open wireless standard for development to be certified by the Z-Wave Alliance.

An early vulnerability was uncovered in AES-encrypted Z-Wave door locks that could be remotely exploited to unlock doors without the knowledge of the encryption keys, and due to the changed keys, subsequent network messages, as in "door is open", would be ignored by the established controller of the network. The vulnerability was not due to a flaw in the Z-Wave protocol specification but was an implementation error by the door-lock manufacturer.

On November 17, 2016, the Z-Wave Alliance announced stronger security standards for devices receiving Z-Wave Certification as of April 2, 2017. Known as Security 2 (or S2), it provides advanced security for smart home devices, gateways and hubs. It shores up encryption standards for transmissions between nodes, and mandates new pairing procedures for each device, with unique PIN or QR codes on each device. The new layer of authentication is intended to prevent hackers from taking control of unsecured or poorly-secured devices. According to the Z-Wave Alliance, the new security standard is the most advanced security available on the market for smart home devices and controllers, gateways and hubs. The 800 series chip, released in late 2021, continues to support standard S2 security capabilities, as well as Silicon Labs Secure Vault technology, enabling wireless devices with PSA Certification Level 3 security.

In 2022, researchers published several vulnerabilities in the Z-Wave chipsets up to the 700 series, based on an open-source protocol-specific fuzzer. As a result, depending on the chipset and device, an attacker within Z-Wave radio range can deny service, cause devices to crash, deplete batteries, intercept, observe, and replay traffic, and control vulnerable devices. The related CVEs (CVE-2020-9057, CVE-2020-9058, CVE-2020-9059, CVE-2020-9060, CVE-2020-9061, CVE-2020-10137) were published by CERT. Z-Wave devices with 100, 200, 300 series chipsets cannot be updated to fix the vulnerabilities. For devices with 500 and 700 chipset series those vulnerabilities could be mitigated through firmware updates.

== Hardware ==
The chip for Z-Wave nodes is the ZW0500, built around an Intel MCS-51 microcontroller with an internal system clock of 32 MHz. The RF part of the chip contains an GisFSK transceiver for a software selectable frequency. With a power supply of 2.2-3.6 volts, it consumes 23mA in transmit mode. Its features include AES-128 encryption, a 100 kbit/s wireless channel, concurrent listening on multiple channels, and USB VCP support.

At the Consumer Electronics Show on January 8, 2018, Sigma Designs introduced its Z-Wave 700 platform. The 700 series chip was released in 2019. It enables a new class of smart home devices that can be used outdoors, with a range of up to 300 feet, and that can operate on a coin-cell battery for up to a decade. Though the 700 series uses a 32-bit ARM Cortex SoC, it remains backward compatible with all other Z-Wave devices. It includes enhanced S2 security framework as well as the SmartStart setup feature. In July 2019, the Z-Wave Alliance announced Z-Wave Plus v2 certification, designed for devices built on the 700 platform, for stronger interoperability and security, and an easier installation process.

Z-Wave Long Range (ZWLR) was announced in September 2020, a new specification with an improved range over regular Z-Wave signals. The specification supports a maximum output power of 30 dBm, which can be used to bolster transmission range by up to several miles. In testing, ZWLR had a transmission distance of 1-mile (1.6 km) direct line of sight utilizing +14-dBm output power. Z-Wave LR is an extra 100-kb/s DSSS OQPSK modulation addition to the Z-Wave protocol. The modulation is treated as a fourth channel, allowing gateways to add long range nodes to the existing Z-Wave channel scanning. Z-Wave LR also increases scalability on a single smart-home network by up to 4,000 nodes, a 20x increase compared to Z-Wave. ZWLR operates on low power so that sensors can last for 10 years on a single coin cell. It is backwards compatible and interoperable with other Z-Wave devices.

In December 2021, Silicon Labs announced the availability of the Z-Wave 800 system-on-chips and modules for the Z-Wave smart home and automation ecosystem. It is described as secure, ultra-low powered, and wireless, for Internet of Things devices, with an improved battery life as compared to the 700 series.

In August 2023, Z-Wave announced that Trident IoT would be a new direct supplier of silicon chips and modules for Z-Wave devices, offer alliance members product design and development services, and work as a certification lab for Z-Wave devices. Trident IoT and Semtech partnered to create a multi-protocol IoT development platform, combining Semtech's LoRa Plus transceivers with Trident's ELCap platform, integrating LoRa with Z-Wave connectivity to simplify IoT product development.

== Comparison to other protocols ==
For smart home wireless networking, there are numerous technologies working together. Z-Wave operates on the sub-1 GHz (low bandwidth) vs 2.4 GHz (high bandwidth) to capitalize on the application-level benefits of low power, long range, less RF interference. WiFi and Bluetooth operate on the 2.4 GHz bandwidth which manages a lot of traffic among devices that consume a lot of power. Other network standards include Bluetooth LE and Thread. Z-Wave has better interoperability than ZigBee, but ZigBee has a faster data transmission rate. Thread and Zigbee operate on the busy Wi-Fi standard frequency of 2.4 GHz, while Z-Wave operates below 1 GHz, which has reduced noise and congestion, and a greater coverage area. All three are mesh networks.

The Z-Wave MAC/PHY is globally standardized by the International Telecommunication Union as ITU 9959 radio, and the Z-Wave Interoperability, Security (S2), Middleware and Z-Wave over IP specifications were all released into the public domain in 2016, and Z-Wave has become a fully-ratified open-source protocol for development.

OpenZWave is a library, written in C++ and wrappers and supporting projects, to interface different languages and protocol(s) allowing anyone to create applications to control devices on a Z-Wave network, without requiring in-depth knowledge of the Z-Wave protocol. This software is currently aimed at application developers who wish to incorporate Z-Wave functionality into their applications. As of November 17, 2022 OpenZWave is no longer being actively maintained.

Matter, brought forth by the Connectivity Standards Alliance, and founded on December 19, 2019, aims to unify device communication so that connected devices will work together, across both wireless technologies and smart home ecosystems. Z-Wave networks have IP at the gateway level, enabling cloud connectivity to Matter. They can also work together at the local network level.

== See also ==
- Bluetooth LE
- Matter (connectivity protocol)
- Thread (network protocol)
- Wi-Fi
- Zigbee
