= Index of home automation articles =

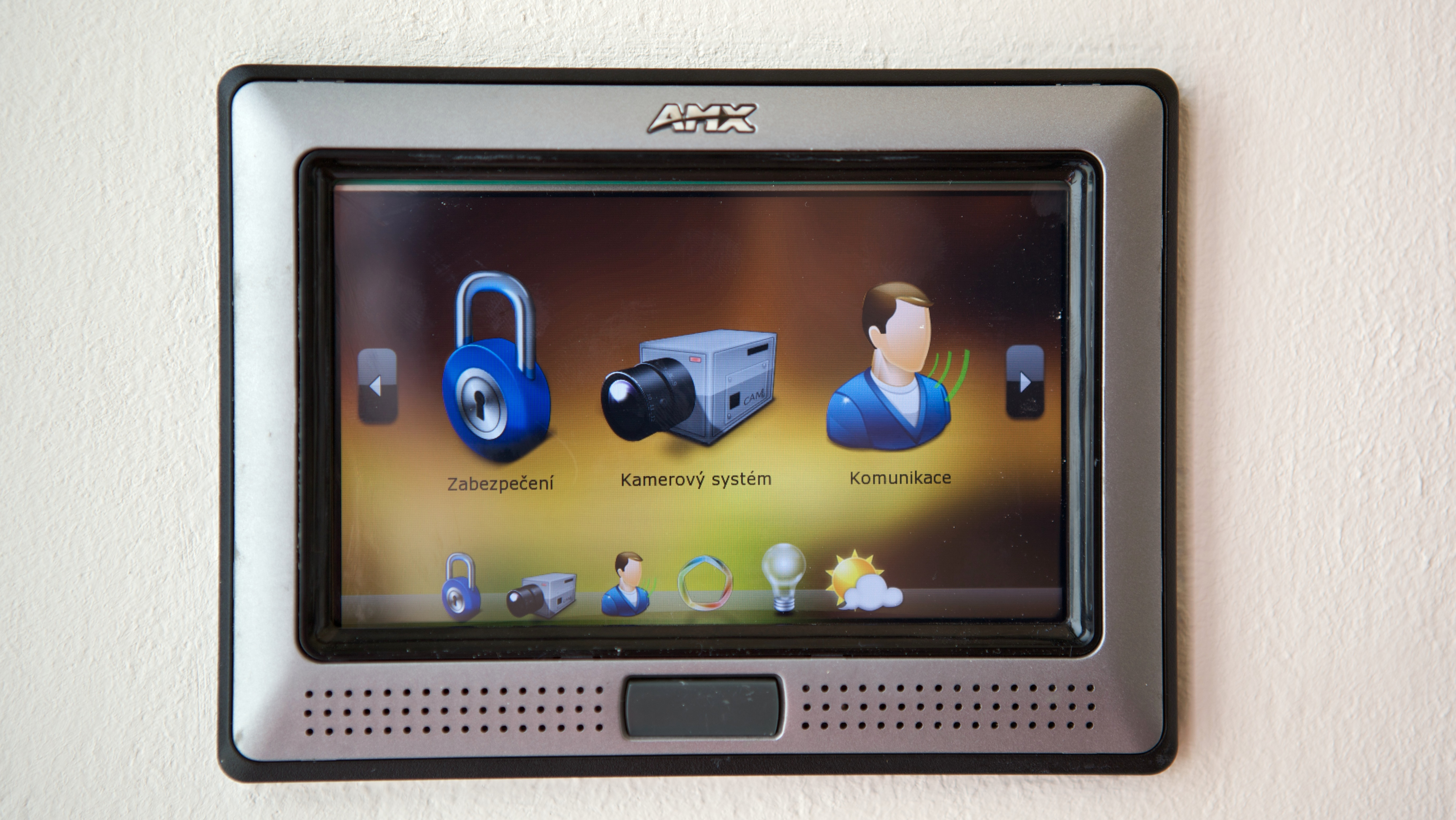
The control panel for a building that has elements of automation

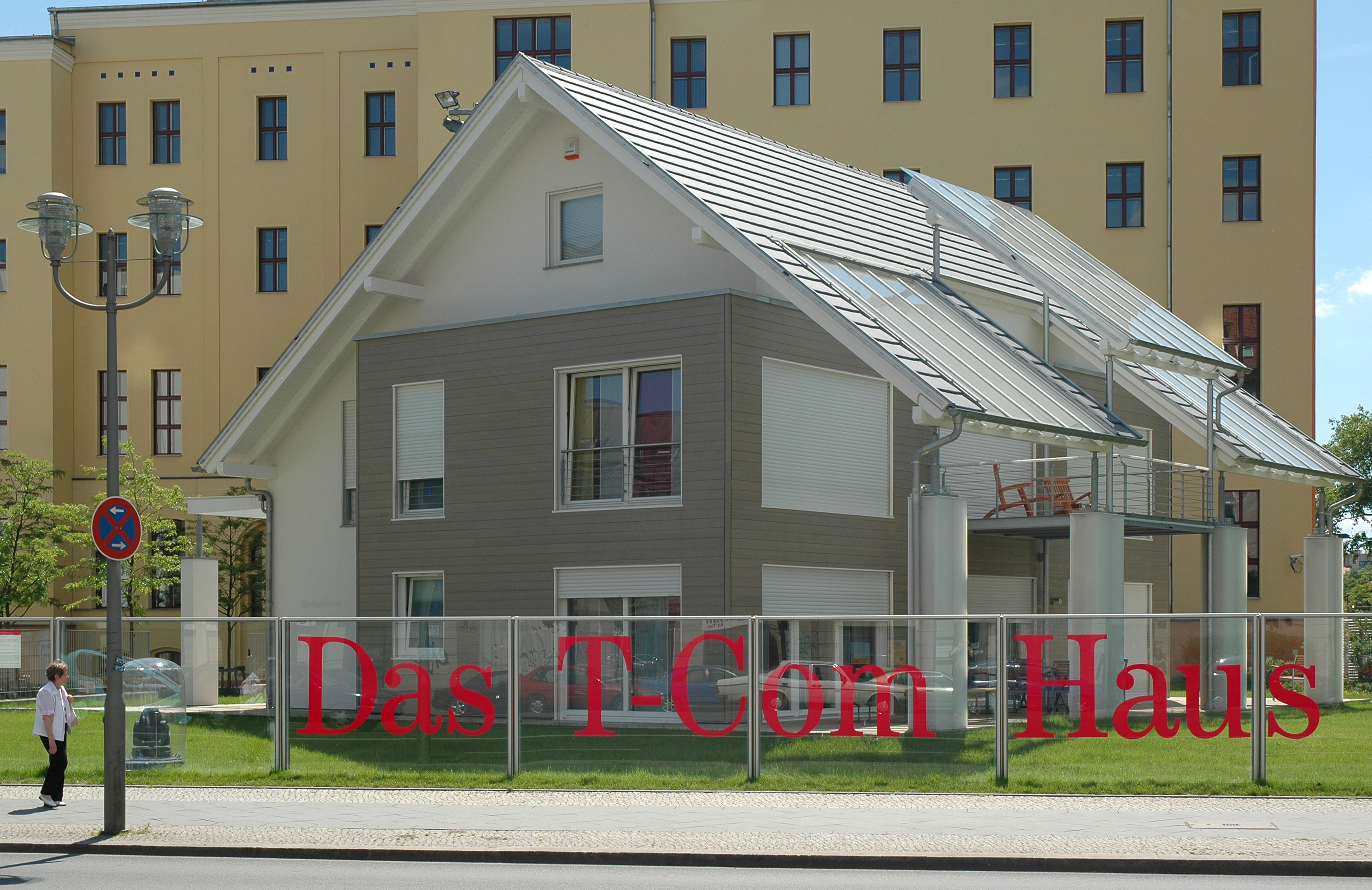
The T-Com-Haus in Berlin, Germany was designed to demonstrate state-of-the-art home automation.

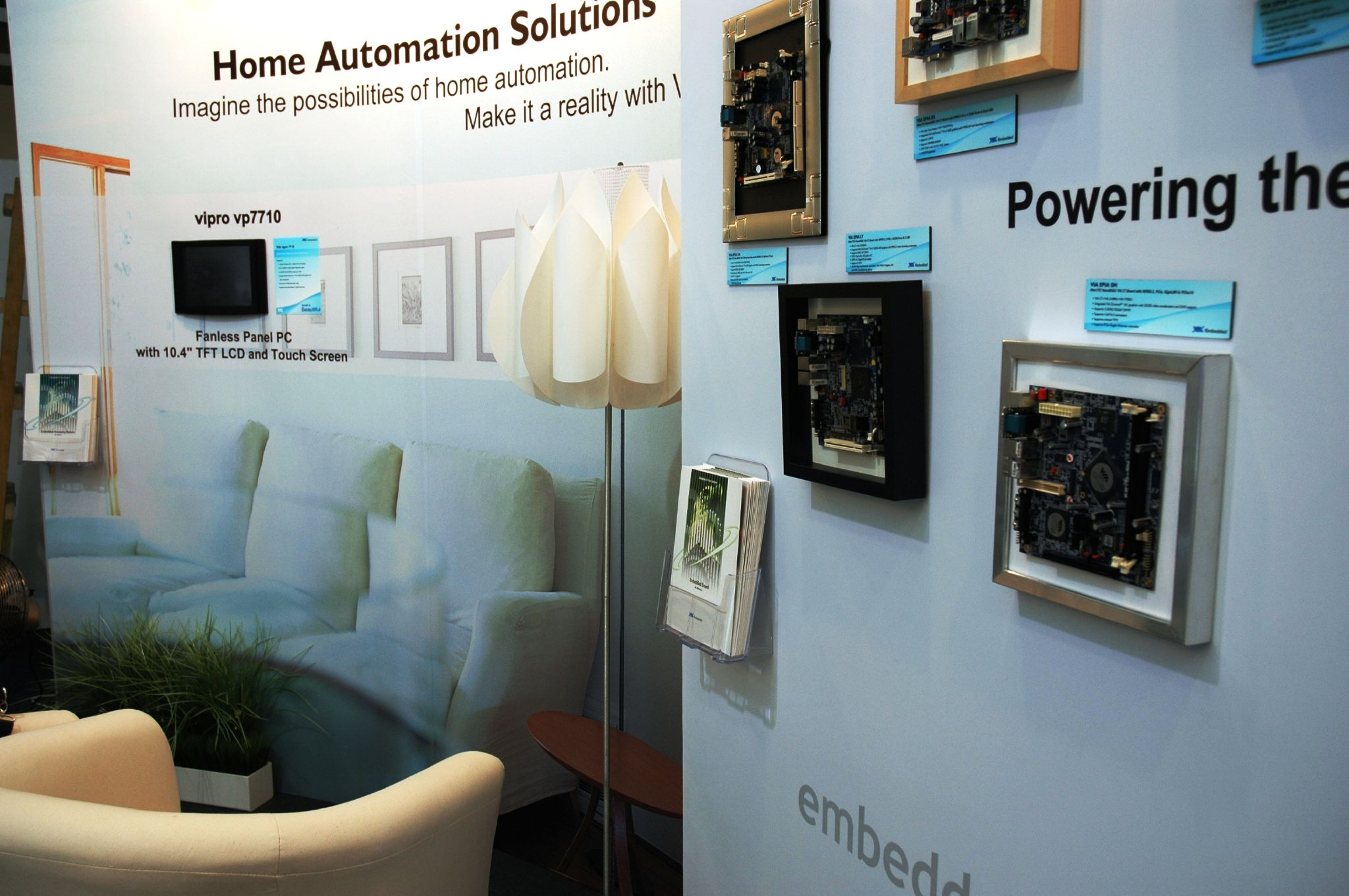
A display at Computex 2008 showing a home automation system and embedded boards

This is a list of home automation topics on Wikipedia. Home automation is the residential extension of building automation. It is automation of the home, housework or household activity. Home automation may include centralized control of lighting, HVAC (heating, ventilation and air conditioning), appliances, security locks of gates and doors and other systems, to provide improved convenience, comfort, energy efficiency and security.

== Home automation topics ==
=== 0-9 ===
- 6LoWPAN

=== A ===
- Alarm.com, Inc.
- AlertMe
- AllJoyn
- Arduino

=== B ===
- Belkin Wemo
- Bluetooth LE (BLE)
- Brillo (Project Brillo)
- Bticino
- Bus SCS
- Building automation

=== C ===
- Connected Device
- C-Bus (protocol)
- CHAIN (industry standard)
- Clipsal C-Bus
- Comparison of domestic robots
- Control4

=== D ===
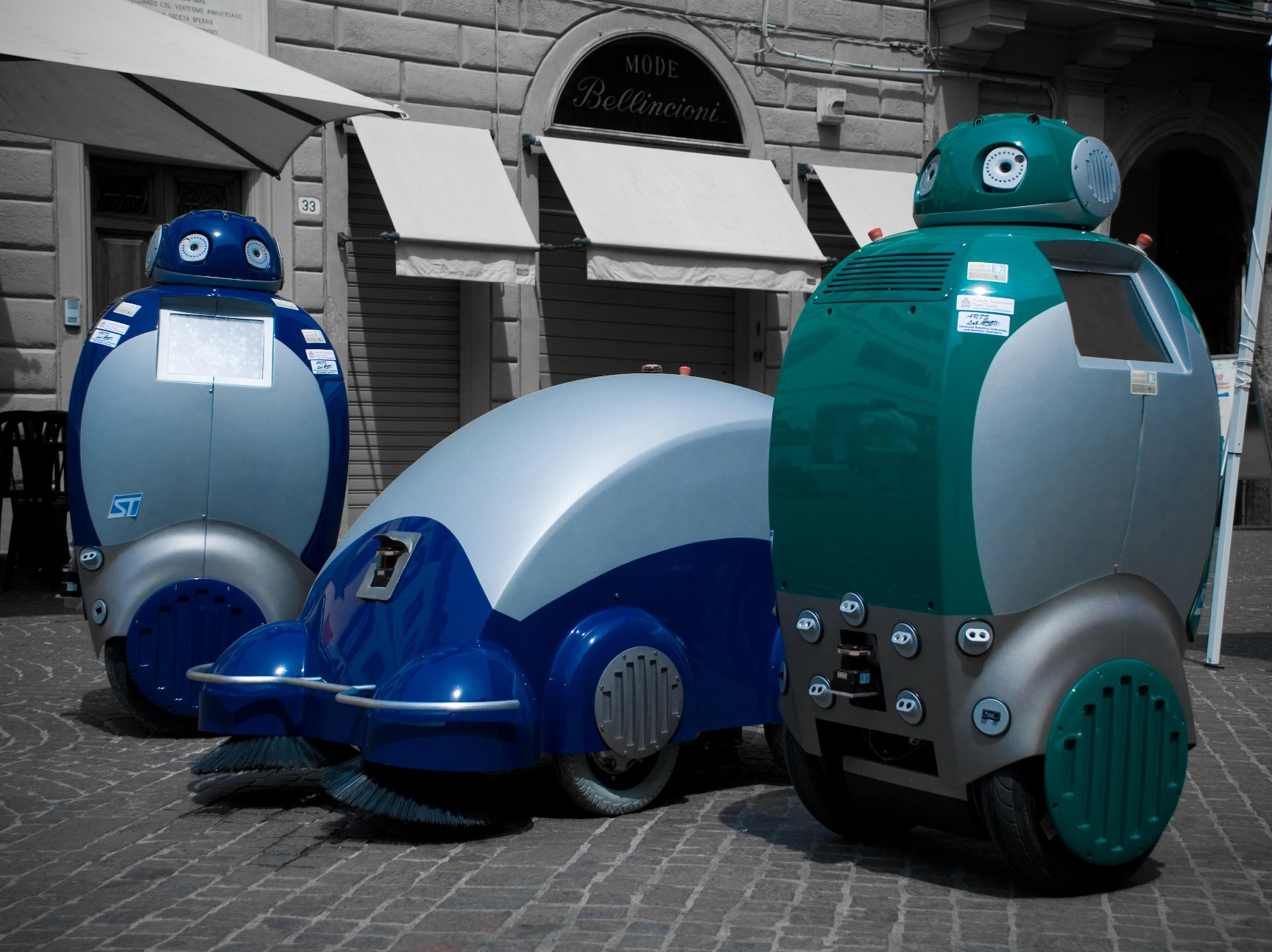
A Dustbot is a domestic robot that can collect garbage from homes. It can be summoned by phone call or SMS, and uses GPS to automatically make its way to the customer, collect the rubbish, and take it to a dustbin.

- Daintree Networks
- Dishwasher
- Domestic robot
- Dynalite

=== E ===
- ESP32
- ESP8266
- Ember (technology company)
- European Home Systems Protocol
- Extron Electronics

=== G ===
- Generalized Automation Language
- GreenPeak Technologies

=== H ===
- Home Assistant (home automation software)
- Home automation
- Home automation for the elderly and disabled
- HomeLink Wireless Control System
- HomeOS
- HomeRF
- Honeywell, Inc.

=== I ===
- Indoor positioning system
- Internet of Things
- Insteon
- Intelligent Home Control
- IoBridge
- iSmartAlarm
- IEEE 802.15.4

=== L ===
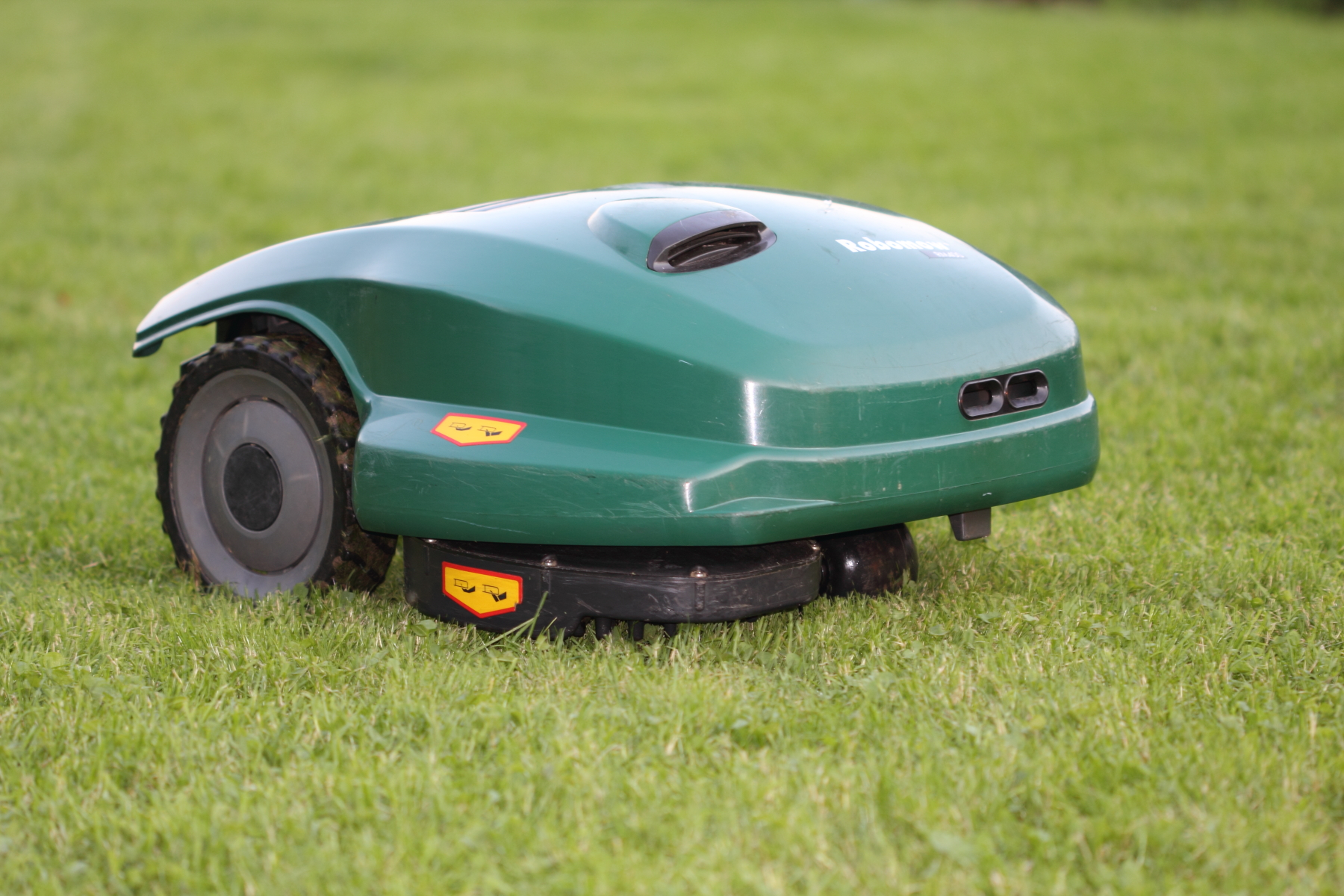
A Robomow robotic lawn mower in action

- Lagotek
- Lawn mower
- Lighting control system
- LinuxMCE
- LonWorks
- List of home automation topics
- List of home automation software
- List of network buses

=== M ===
- Marata Vision
- Matter (standard)
- MCU (Micro Controller Unit)
- MiWi
- Mobile device
- Mobile Internet device

=== N ===
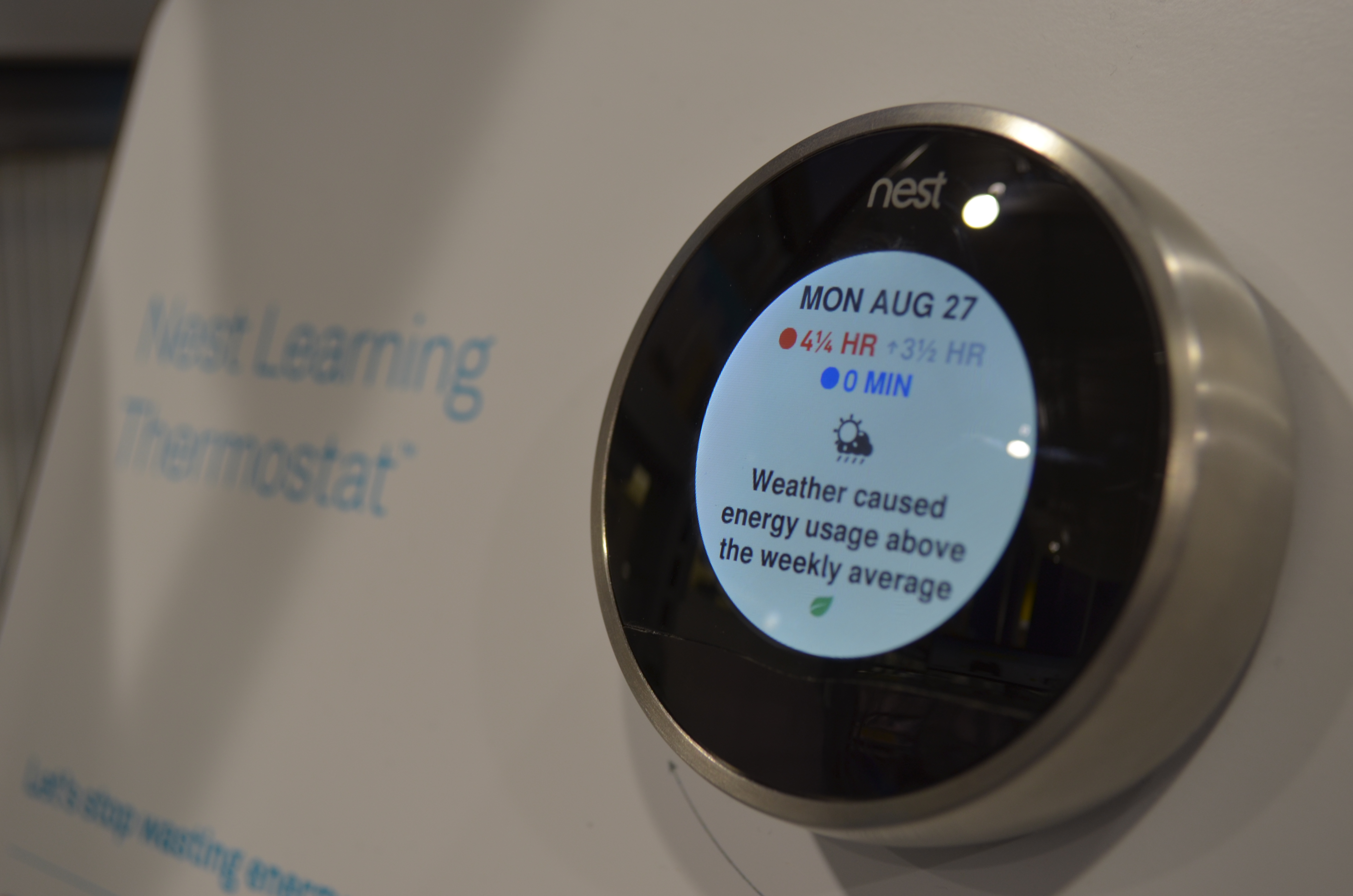
Nest Learning Thermostat showing weather's impact on energy usage

- Nest Labs
- NodeMCU

=== O ===
- OpenHAN
- Openpicus
- OpenTherm

=== R ===
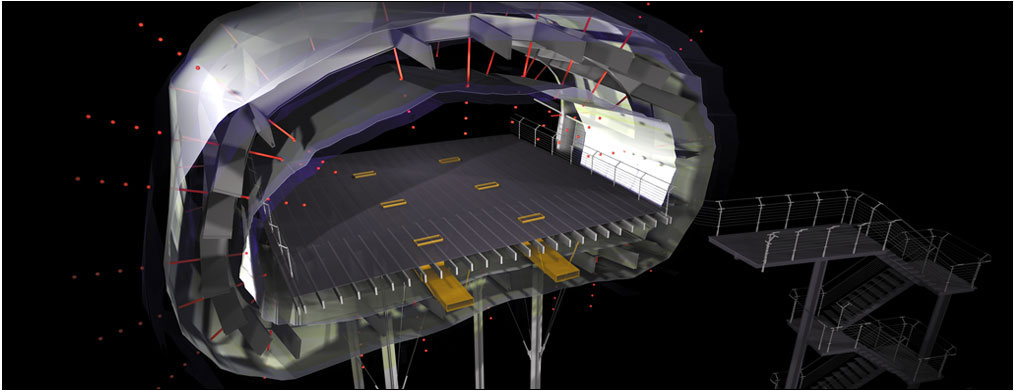
Responsive architecture: a diagram for a building that can change shape

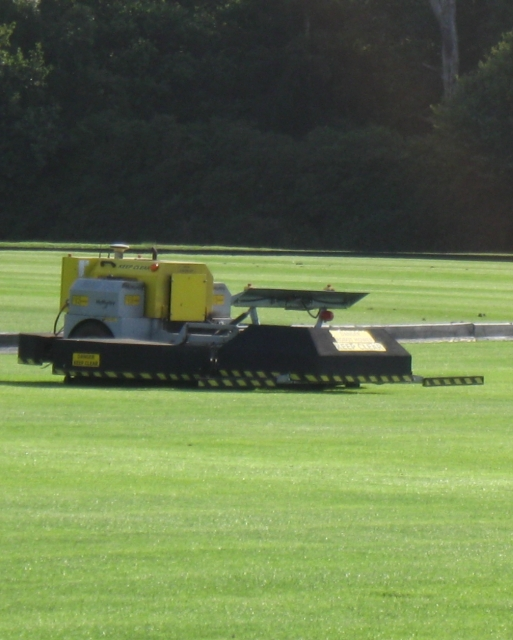
An industrial-sized robotic/remote controlled robotic lawn mower

- Responsive architecture
- Robotic lawn mower
- Rotimatic

=== S ===
- SM4All
- Smart device
- Smart environment
- Smart grid
- Smartlabs
- Smart lock
- Stardraw

=== T ===
- Timer
- Thread (network protocol)

=== U ===
- Universal Home API
- Universal powerline bus

=== V ===
- Vacuum cleaner

=== W ===
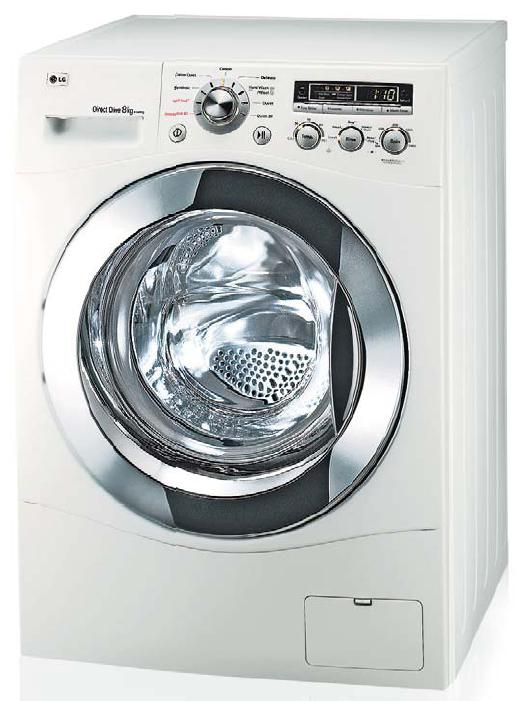
A modern front-loading washing machine

- Web of Things
- Washing machine
- Window blind

=== X ===
- X10 (industry standard)
- X10 Firecracker
- XAP Home Automation protocol
- XPL Protocol

=== Z ===
- Z-Wave
- Zigbee

== See also ==
- Home automation
- List of home automation topics
- List of home automation software
- List of home appliances
- Building automation
- Connected Devices
- Robotics
