= XAP =

XAP might refer to:

- XAP processor, a CPU architecture for computers, developed by Cambridge Consultants since 1994
- XAP (Extensible Authoring Publishing), an old name for Extensible Metadata Platform (XMP)
- XAP (file format), container format for mobile apps and Silverlight web apps
- XAP, The IATA airport code for Chapecó Airport
- xAP Home Automation protocol
- XAP, The ICAO Code for Midway Connection, operated by Fischer Brothers Aviation of the United States
