= XPL (disambiguation) =

XPL may refer to:

== Computing ==
- XPL, a dialect of the PL/I programming language, developed in 1967, used for the development of compilers for computer languages
- XPL Protocol, an open protocol intended to permit the control and monitoring of home automation devices
- XML Pipeline Language, a dataflow-oriented XML processing language
  - .xpl, a filename extension used for XProc script/pipeline
- .xpl, a HDi playlist file extension

== Places ==
- XPL, an IATA code for Soto Cano Air Base
- XPL, an ICAO code for Express Line Aircompany

== Other ==
- Spirit XPL, a Gibson Spirit guitar model
- XPL, an abbreviation for cross-polarized light
