= Smart environment =

Computing environment involving multiple devices

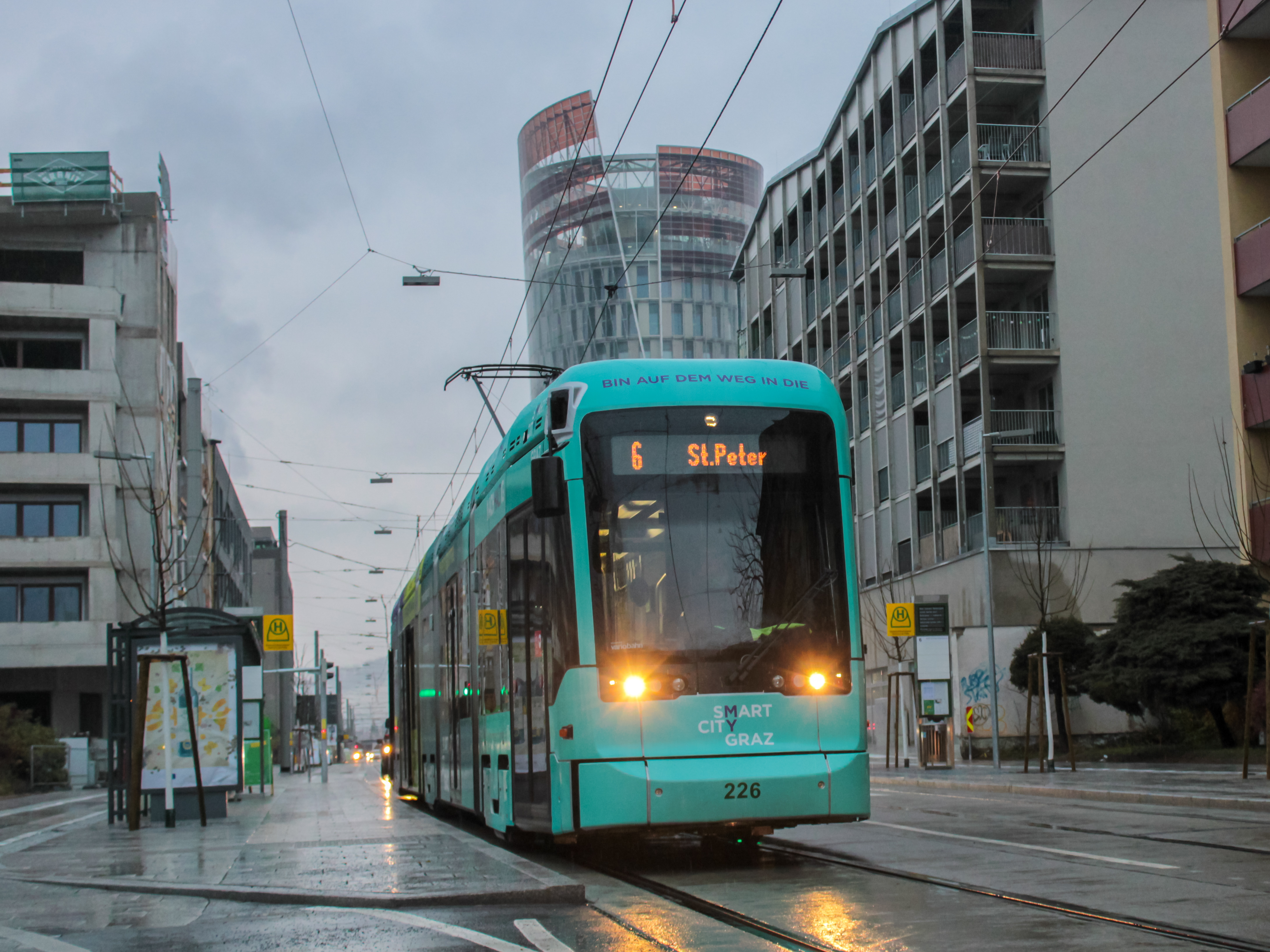
Smart city

Smart environments link computers and other smart devices to everyday settings and tasks. Smart environments include smart homes, smart cities, and smart manufacturing.

== Introduction ==
Smart environments are an extension of pervasive computing. According to Mark Weiser, pervasive computing promotes the idea of a world that is connected to sensors and computers. These sensors and computers are integrated with everyday objects in peoples' lives and are connected through networks.

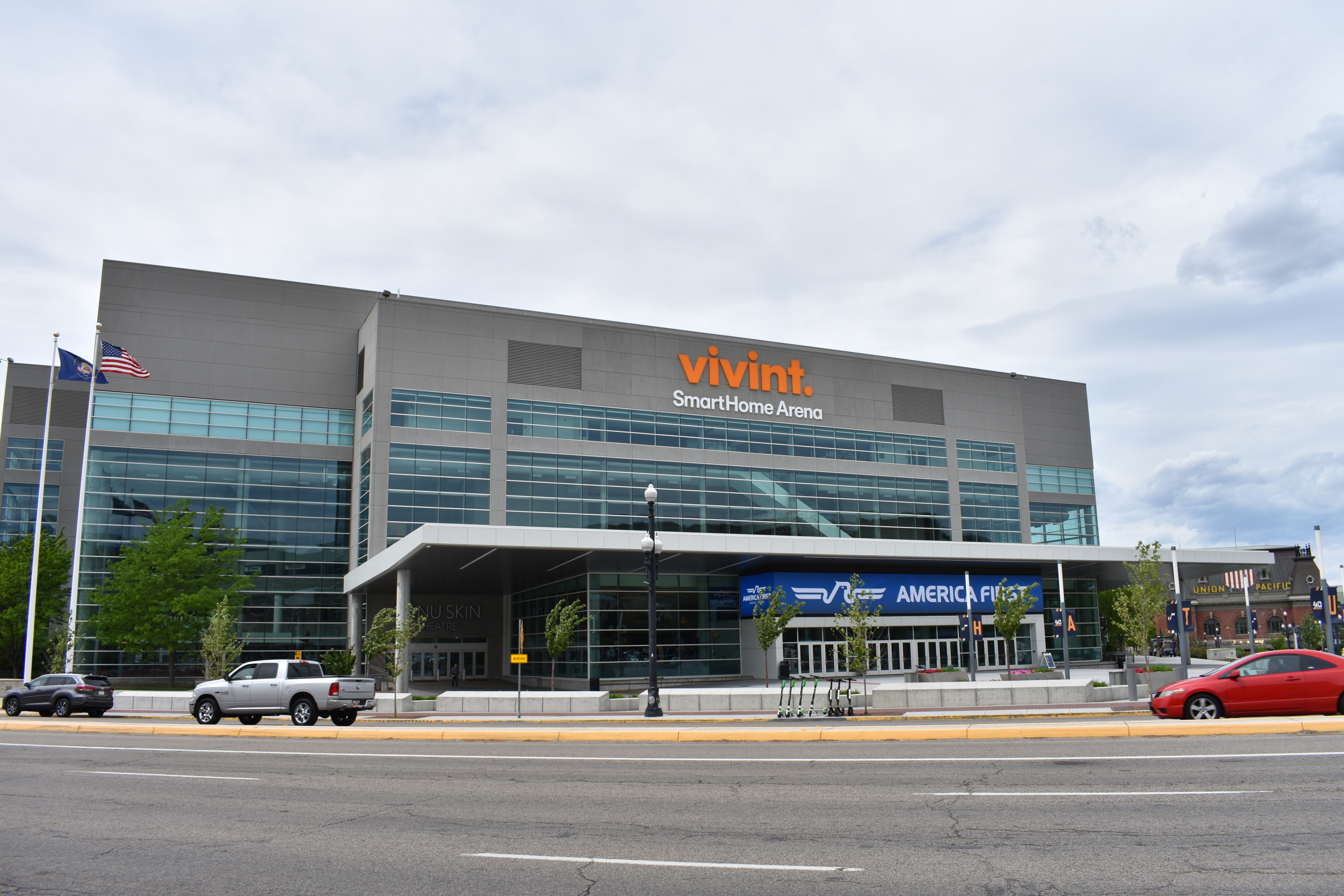
Smart home

== Definition ==
Cook and Das, define a smart environment as "a small world where different kinds of smart devices are continuously working to make inhabitants' lives more comfortable." Smart environments aim to satisfy the experience of individuals from every environment, by replacing hazardous work, physical labor, and repetitive tasks with automated agents. Poslad differentiates three different kinds of smart environments for systems, services, and devices: virtual (or distributed) computing environments, physical environments, and human environments, or a hybrid combination of these:

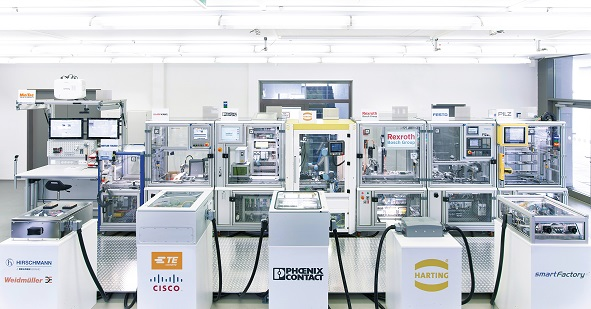
- Smart manufacturing
  Virtual computing environments enable smart devices to access pertinent services anywhere and anytime.
- Physical environments may be embedded with various smart devices of different types including tags, sensors, and controllers, and have different form factors ranging from nano- to micro- to macro-sized.
- Human environments: humans, either individually or collectively, inherently form a smart environment for devices. However, humans themselves may be accompanied by smart devices such as mobile phones, use surface-mounted devices (wearable computing), and contain embedded devices (e.g., pacemakers to maintain a healthy heart operation or AR contact lenses)

== Features ==
Smart environments encompass a range of features and services across various domains, including smart homes, smart cities, smart health, and smart factories. Some of the key features of smart environments are:

Sensors and Actuators: Smart environments are equipped with an assembly of sensors and actuators that collect data and initiate actions to provide services for the betterment of human life.

Interconnected Systems: These environments consist of interconnected systems that enable seamless communication and coordination among various devices and components.

Data-Driven Technologies: Smart environments leverage data-driven technologies, such as the Internet of Things (IoT), to obtain information from the physical world, process it, and perform actions accordingly.

Efficiency and Sustainability: They are designed to improve efficiency, sustainable practices, and resource management across different settings, such as energy efficiency in smart homes and environmental quality management in smart cities.

Diverse Requirements: Different types of smart environments have diverse requirements and technology choices, influencing the processing and utilization of data within a specific environment.

== Technologies ==
Building a smart environment involves technologies of

1. Wireless communication
2. Algorithm design, signal prediction & classification, information theory
3. Multilayered software architecture, Corba, middleware
4. Speech recognition
5. Image processing, image recognition
6. Sensors design, calibration, motion detection, temperature, pressure sensors, accelerometers
7. Semantic Web and knowledge graphs
8. Adaptive control, Kalman filters
9. Computer networking
10. Parallel processing
11. Operating systems

== Existing projects ==
The Aware Home Research Initiative at Georgia Tech "is devoted to the multidisciplinary exploration of emerging technologies and services based in the home" and was launched in 1998 as one of the first "living laboratories." The Mav Home (Managing an Adaptive Versatile Home) project, at UT Arlington, is a smart environment-lab with state-of-the-art algorithms and protocols used to provide a customized, personal environment to the users of this space. The Mav Home project, in addition to providing a safe environment, wants to reduce the energy consumption of the inhabitants. Other projects include House at the MIT Media Lab and many others.

== See also ==
- Building automation
- Device ecology
- Home robot
- Intelligent building
- List of home automation topics
- Smart, connected products
- Ubiquitous computing
