= Navimow =

Robotic lawnmower manufacturer

- Type: Private
- Industry: Robotics
- Founded: September 2021
- Headquarters: Beijing
- Area served: Worldwide
- Key people: George Ren (CEO)
- Products: Robotic lawn mowers
- Owner: Segway
- Website: navimow.com

Segway Navimow, often simply known as Navimow, is a robotic lawnmower manufacturer founded in 2021. As of mid-2025, its main products include the H-Series, i-Series, and X3-Series robot lawn mowers. The H500E is one of its earliest models, and the i105N is a representative product of the brand. It developed a technology called EFLS. In addition, it also owns and operates the Navimow app.

The brand specializes in the manufacture of robomowers. The products of Navimow are available in the U.S., Germany, and France, among others. The brand's robotic mowers use GPS navigation systems to operate on lawns. Its self-guided mowers can handle mowing tasks on preset schedules. In March 2024, its i-Series products were introduced in Europe.

== History ==
Navimow was first launched by Segway Ninebot on September 2, 2021 in Beijing. In 2022, the brand launched the H-Series. In the same year, it entered the European market. In January 2024, it participated in the CES Show.

In March 2024, Navimow rolled out the Navimow i cordless robotic mowers. In January 2025, the brand showcased the X3 Series at CES 2025. In the spring of the same year, the X3 Series went on sale.
