= IHC =

IHC may refer to:

== Medicine ==
- Immunohistochemistry
- Intrahepatic cholestasis

== Science and technology ==
- Indirectly Heated Cathode, a type of hot cathode used in vacuum electronics tubes
- Intelligent Home Control, home automation and control system
- FAT IHC OEM label, a Windows 9x signature in OEM labels of FAT volumes

== Transport ==
- Inhaca Airport, Mozambique (by IATA code)

== Organisations ==
- IHC New Zealand, a national organisation for the support of intellectually disabled persons
- Immigration Holding Centres, Canadian immigration detention facilities
- India Habitat Centre
- Interagency Hotshot Crew, a Type 1 handcrew of wildland firefighters
- Interchurch Holiness Convention, an ecumenical organization of Wesleyan-Arminian denominations
- Intermountain Healthcare, a healthcare network in Utah, United States
- International Harvester Corporation
- International Humanitarian City
- International Hat Company
- Islamabad High Court, a court in Islamabad, Pakistan

== Other ==
- IHC (Greek: ΙΗΣ), a Christogram
- Institute for Human Continuity, a viral marketing campaign for the film 2012
