= EEVE =

Belgian company

- Formerly: The Toadi Order
- Company type: Private
- Industry: AI, robotics
- Founded: 2017
- Headquarters: Belgium
- Key people: Wesley Lorrez (Founding CEO)
- Website: https://eeve.com/

EEVE is a Belgian company that develops and produces personal robots.

Since its foundation in 2017, EEVE has used two alternative names: AIRobots (2017) and The Toadi Order (2018–2020).

EEVE's flagship product, the perimeter-free lawn robot Willow, is a robot capable of mowing lawns and conducting surveillance, with the ability to equip additional tools and operate solely on computer vision and artificial intelligence. Willow was introduced in the United States via a Kickstarter campaign in 2020 with object recognition and security features. The first test robot deliveries in the US occurred in 2023.

== See also ==
- Robotic lawn mower
