= Luskin =

Luskin is a Jewish surname of Russian origin. It is a habitational name for a person from Luski, a village now in Belarus. Notable people with the surname include:

- Donald Luskin (born 1954), Chief Investment Officer for Trend Macrolytics, LLC
- Eugene Luskin, CEO and founder of Lagotek
- Harvey Molotch (born Harvey Luskin), American sociologist
- Robert Luskin (born 1950), attorney and partner in the law firm of Paul Hastings LLP

Luskin's was a home appliance store in the Baltimore area founded by Jack Luskin.
