= Dustbot =

Prototype garbage-collection robot

- Dustbot Demo Pontedera.
- Inception: 2009
- Website: http://www.dustbot.org/

Dustbot was a prototype robot that collected garbage from homes and streets. It could be summoned by phone call or SMS, and used GPS to automatically make its way to the customer, collect the rubbish, and take it to a dustbin. In addition, the Dustbots carried environmental sensors to monitor the pollution levels over, for example, a pedestrian area. Prototypes were tested in Italy, in Sweden, in Korea and Japan. Launch was planned in 2009, but the last reference in its webpage dates from 2011. The Dustbot project was funded by the European Commission and it never launched as a commercial product.

== Technical ==
Dustbot uses different localisation and uses GPS navigation combined with pre-loaded maps. It uses a gyroscope to keep it upright, and has ultrasonic, infrared and laser sensors to avoid collisions with static and dynamic obstacles.

It is able to monitor pollution through a number of air quality sensors, and can warn if the levels are too high. This is especially important in the case of gases that humans cannot sense or when long-term exposure to slightly increased concentrations needs to be verified. The distribution of gases is modelled using statistical methods.

Two DustCart robots were deployed in the village of Peccioli, Tuscany, from June 15, 2010, to August 7, 2010, providing "door to door separate waste collection on demand". The system was found to be easy to use, providing satisfactory service and increasing recycling. Its main weaknesses were "slow service/traffic problems (and) low bin capacity", and also the existence of "barriers to entry", according to a report by Nicola Canelli presented during ICT 2010 Conference Session, held in Bruxelles, September 27, 2010. As of November 10, 2017, the project seems to have been ended; still, the Dustbot homepage is online to this day, the last "news" update being apparently done in 2011. There is also a reference to the project in a presentation by Paolo Dario at the International Workshop on Autonomics and Legal Implications (Berlin, November 2, 2012).

== See also ==
- Comparison of domestic robots
- Domestic robot
- List of home automation topics
- Robotic mapping
- Robotics suite
