= Eugene Luskin =

Eugene Luskin is the CEO and founder of VYRTY Corporation. Previously, Luskin was the CEO and founder of Lagotek. Earlier in his career Luskin worked as a software engineer at Intel and Microsoft. The VYRTYreader is a tool designed to help physicians communicate clinically important data using a card reader and card system that allows the patient for the first time ever to possess all the records needed to manage their care on the most secure and HIPAA compliant system ever invented. All the records are stored on a card the size of a credit card. The patient, the doctor, and the reader each have separate encrypted security, and all three are needed to use the system. Records can be completed using the VYRTYreader after the patient has left the office, with stringent security. Only the useful records need be put on the card.

VYRTY has solved the record security problem, delivered HIPAA, and bypassed entirely the interoperability problem.

This system supports the doctor, and the patient. Scalability potential is to every human being. The system is agnostic as to your EMR, since it mimics the printer and print functions common to all systems: print to, and print from, the card.
