= OpenWebNet =

Communications protocol

OpenWebNet is a communications protocol developed by Bticino since 2000.

The OpenWebNet protocol allows a "high-level" interaction between a remote unit and Bus SCS of MyHome domotic system. The latest protocol evolution has been improved to allow interaction with well-known home automation systems like KNX and DMX512-A system, by using appropriate gateways.

The OpenWebNet protocol is disclosed on MyOpen community.

== OpenWebNet Protocol ==
The protocol is thought to be independent from the used technology. For example, it is possible to use a supervisor software connected via Ethernet, via serial RS-232 or via USB to a gateway that is directly connected to a domotic system. One can require protocol message extension. It is enough to propose their own RFC. It will be examined and disclosed if it respects OpenWebNet syntax.

=== Syntax ===
An OpenWebNet message is structured with variable length fields separated by the special character '*' and closed by '##'.

The characters admitted in the fields are numbers and the character “#”.

The structure of a message is therefore:

- field1*field2*... *fieldN##

The following fields are admitted: WHO WHAT WHERE DIMENSION VALUE

WHO

It characterizes the domotic system function to which the OpenWebNet message is referred.

For example: WHO = 1, characterizes the messages for lighting system management.

WHAT

It characterizes an action to do or a status to read. For every WHO (and therefore for every function) there is a specific WHAT table.

The field WHAT can also contain optional parameters: WHAT#PAR1#PAR2... #PARn.

Example of actions: switch ON light, dimmer to 75%, switch DOWN shutter, radio ON, etc. Example of status: light ON, active alarm, battery unload, etc.

WHERE

It characterizes the set of objects to which the OpenWebNet message is referred. It can be a single object, a group of objects, a specific environment, the entire system, etc.

For every WHO (and therefore for every function) there is a specified WHERE table.

The tag WHERE can also contain optional parameters: WHERE#PAR1#PAR2... #PARn.

Example of where: all the lights of group 1, sensor 2 of zone 1 of alarm system, etc.

DIMENSION

Is a range of value that characterizes the dimension of the object to which the message is referred. For every WHO (and therefore for every function) there is a specific DIMENSION table.

It's possible to require/to read/to write the value of one dimension. Every dimension has a prefixed number of values, described in VALUE field.

Example of dimension: sensor temperature, loudspeaker volume, firmware version of a device, etc.

VALUE

It characterizes the read/written value of a written/required/read dimension.

=== Message ===
There are 4 types of OpenWebNet Message:

- Command / Status Message
- Status Request Message
- Request/Read/Write Dimension Message
- Acknowledge Message

Command / Status Message

*WHO*WHAT*WHERE##

Status Request Message

*#WHO*WHERE##

Request/Read/Write Dimension Message Request:

*#WHO*WHERE*DIMENSION##

Read:

*#WHO*WHERE*DIMENSION*VALUE1*...*VALUEn##

Write:

*#WHO*WHERE*#DIMENSION*VALUE1*...*VALUEn##

Acknowledge Message ACK:

*#*1##

NACK:

*#*0##

== Gateway OpenWebNet ==
It is possible to interact with the SCS home automation bus by using a specific gateway.

There are two typologies of gateways that allow a connection to the field bus by using different standard protocols:

- Gateway Ethernet (Linux-based)
- Gateway USB or RS-232

=== Gateway Ethernet ===
The current implementation by BTicino is also an embedded web server. It works as a translator between OpenWebNet messages via TCP/IP and the SCS messages transmitted on the SCS bus.

It is possible to control three different kinds of buses:

- BUS SCS
- KNX
- DMX

The Ethernet gateway offers two modes of authentication:

- via a list of whitelisted IPAs
- using a nonce-type password exchange (see in the external links for code) (used on older devices)
- using a hmac based authentication algorithm (can be found in the documentation, external links) (used on newer devices)

Usually, the default port for the Ethernet gateway is 20000 even if the registered port for the protocol is 20005.

=== Gateway USB or RS-232 ===
The gateway is an interface that works as a translator between the OpenWebNet messages transmitted on USB or serial and the SCS messages transmitted on the SCS bus.

== Functions ==
WHO value	Function
0	Scenario
1	Lighting
2	Automation
3	Load control
4	Temperature Control/Heating
5	Burglar Alarm/Intrusion
6	Door Entry System
7	Video Door Entry System/multimedia
9	Auxiliary
13	Gateway/interfaces management
14	Light+shutters actuators lock
15	CEN/Scenario Scheduler, switch
16	Sound System/Audio
17	Scenario programming
18	Energy Management
24	Lighting Management
25	CEN/Scenario Scheduler, buttons
1000	Diagnostic
1001	Automation diagnostic
1004	Thermoregulation diagnostic failures
1013	Device diagnostic

WHERE value	Lighting Function
0	General
1÷9	Room 1÷9
11÷99	Light point 11÷99
#1÷#9	Group 1÷9

== Example ==
OpenWebNet message examples

Command Message

Switch Off of light 77

*1*0*77##

WHO = 1 WHAT = 0 WHERE = 77

Status Message

Scenario 1 of scenario unit 23 activated.

*0*1*23##

WHO = 0 WHAT = 1 WHERE = 23

Request status message

Status request of probe 1

*#4*1##

WHO = 4 WHERE = 1

Request Dimension Message

Request of Temperature Measured, probe 44

*#4*44*0##

WHO = 4 WHERE = 44 DIMENSION = 0

Read Dimension Message

Temperature Measured, probe 44

*#4*44*0*0251*2##

WHO = 4 WHERE = 44 DIMENSION = 0 VALUE1 = 0251 (T=+25,1 °C) VALUE2 = 2 (System in "cooling mode")

Write Dimension Message

Volume set at 50%, environment 2

*#16*#2*#1*16*##

WHO = #16 WHAT = #2 WHERE = #1 DIMENSION = 1 VALUE1 = 16

== See also ==
- Home automation
- KNX
- DMX
