= AVSnap =

- Developer: Altinex Inc.
- Release: 21:00, 12 November 2004
- Stable release: 6.6.9 / 20 January 2021; 5 years ago
- Operating system: Microsoft Windows NT, 2000, and Windows 7
- Type: Computer-aided design
- License: Freeware
- Website: AVSnap homepage

AVSnap is a freeware audio/visual system integration and design software, developed and released by Altinex Inc. in 2004. It creates a visual routing diagram of an audio/visual system that is similar to an A/V schematic or a computer network diagram. The software provides a design environment to create audiovisual diagrams and layouts.

== Functionality ==
- AV System Design – Allows the user to create library symbols, assign snap points property, connect symbols with cable object and generate list of materials and cables.
- AV System Layout – Allows the user to create symbols for front or back panels, position them in a rack and connect them with cable. Provide wiring diagram to a technician for rack wiring.
- Flow Chart Mode – Allows the user to develop a variety of flow charts.
- Presentation mode – Allows the user to present multiple pages. All keys work in a similar way to PowerPoint.
- Communication mode – Test all protocols for communicating with equipment using communication mode. Press the telephone icon to transform AVSnap into a Hyperterminal with a twist. You have two windows: Terminal window and Notepad. Jot down commands and then send them through a COM port or over the network.
- Language editor – If you want to use your native language with AVSnap, select language editor and type in all the text displayed. Once done, switch to your own language for simplicity.
- GUI design — Set page format to pixels to reveal the GUI design environment. Design buttons, sliders, and video objects. Import PNG files to create the GUI background and press F11 for full development language. Execute created program on a PC or a standalone touch pane.
- Web server (License required) – Anything you design in AVSnap can be served on the web. Graphics, pages, GUI, or anything else. GUI can be used to control equipment over the web.

== Libraries ==
AVSnap can combine groups of objects into libraries that users can select from to create their diagrams. Users can create their libraries or choose from ones included from other companies, including Simtrol, Calypso Systems, and partner Analog Way.

== History ==
The origins of AVSnap started in 1993, a time where very few vendors provided software for designing AV systems. As such, many AV professionals desired a development tool that could be used in-house and offer an easy information exchange.

== See also ==
- Stardraw
- AutoCAD
