= SM4All =

Smart hoMes for All (SM4All) is an international scientific research project funded by the European Community. It started on September 1, 2008, and will end on August 31, 2011. The SM4All project aims at studying and developing an innovative middleware platform for inter-working of smart embedded services in immersive and personcentric environments, through the use of composability and semantic techniques, in order to guarantee dynamicity, dependability and scalability, while preserving the privacy and security of the platform and its users. This is applied to the challenging scenario of private/home/building in presence of users with different abilities and needs (e.g., young able bodied aged and disabled).

== Project partners ==
- Sapienza University of Rome
- Swedish Defence Research Agency (FOI)
- Elsag Datamat(it)
- Technische Universitaet Wien
- Fondazione Santa Lucia(it)
- Guger Technologies
- University of Groningen
- Thuiszorg Het Friese Land
- Telefónica Investigacion y Desarrollo
- Kungliga Tekniska Hogskolan

== Technical approaches ==
In the design of the SM4All platform, there will be a specific focus on ontologies for describing service capabilities, to be used for obtaining the dynamic configuration and composition of the services, while preserving the privacy of the users. Within this project an innovative middleware platform for inter-working of smart embedded services by leveraging on peer-to-peer (P2P) technologies will be investigated. In particular, in the SM4All project, P2P, service orientation and context-awareness are merged in novel ways in order to define general reference architecture for embedded middleware targeted to immersive scenarios, among which the domotics and home-care have been selected as showcases.

P2P systems (P2P) have become a popular technique to design large-scale distributed applications in unmanaged inter-domain settings, such as file sharing or chat systems, thanks to their capabilities to self-organize and evenly split the load among peers. The platform is inherently scalable and able to resist to devices’ churn and failures, while preserving the privacy of its human users as well as the security of the whole environment. The embedded systems are specialized computers used to control equipment such as the smart homes. To enable interoperation among heterogeneous devices and to provide a service-oriented basis, the project considers XML based protocols such as Web services and Universal Plug and Play (UPnP).

For example, a woman wants to take a bath. She enters this goal into the computer. Something happens then: The temperature in the bathroom will rise. The water runs in the bathtub with the preferred temperature. The cupboard opens to offer towels. If the woman is disabled, her nurse will be informed by the system.

In SM4All, the focus is on the process-oriented composition of stateful services. The idea is that a triggering condition in the home or a desire of the user can trigger the execution of a complex process. The process is defined in the moment that it needs to be executed. It automatically composes services available on home devices and appliances. The execution of the process thus depends on the context of the home, of its inhabitant and the available services. To achieve this it is necessary to identify the home context, to discover available devices and services and to compose them at execution time. In the SM4All project we consider Automated planning and scheduling approaches for the composition such as the "Roman Model" and the "Barbarian" constraint based approach.

Two techniques adopted in the SM4All project are:

Brain Computer Interface for Virtual-Reality Control
An electroencephalogram (EEG) based brain-computer interface (BCI) was connected with a virtual reality system in order to control a smart home application. Therefore, special control masks were developed which allowed using the P300 component of the EEG as input signal for the BCI system. Control commands for switching TV channels, for opening and closing doors and windows, for navigation and conversation were realized. Experiments with 12 subjects were made to investigate the speed and accuracy that can be achieved if several hundred of commands are used to control the smart home environment. The study clearly shows that such a BCI system can be used for smart home control. The Virtual Reality approach is a very cost-effective way for testing the smart home environment together with the BCI system.

Service Composition
Sensors and devices collaborate one another as service providing and requesting nodes of a network. A service can be a purely information one (e.g., providing the temperature in a room) or a state changing one (closing all the lights in a room). Atomic services are then amenable to discovery and composition, enabling the home to perform complex tasks. The user can than express a goal, such as that of possibly according to some optimality measure. For instance the user may want to take a bath. The goal will be translated into a process invoking various services (turning on the heater in the bathroom, the lights, putting an alarm in the living room, checking that there is hot water available, etc.). Notice that the same goal can take different execution forms in different homes or in different conditions (e.g., the alarm in the living room is not available, but the goal of taking a bath is still satisfied).
