= Stardraw =

Ex-Microsoft development manager David Snipp

- Developer: Stardraw.com
- Initial release: 1995
- Operating system: Microsoft Windows NT, 2000, XP, Vista, Windows 7
- Type: Computer-aided design, System integration
- Website: www.stardraw.com

Stardraw is a software company that makes audio/visual system integration and design software. It was founded in 1993 by ex-Microsoft development manager David Snipp.

== Products ==
Stardraw develops computer aided design software for creating documentation of audio/visual systems. This includes A/V schematics (similar to a Computer network diagram), Rack Layouts, Presentation Drawings (Pictorial Schematics), Panel Layouts for custom metalwork, Plan View drawings, and associated reports such as Bills of Materials, Quotations and Cable Schedules.

It also develops control software for creating touchscreen remote control systems for integrated development environments.

Typical uses include room automation in boardrooms, auditoriums, museums or home theaters, where users use fixed and wireless touch-screens to control devices such as video projectors and displays, PCs, DVD and VCR players and recorders, cameras, teleconferencing systems, audio/video switchers and processing equipment, motorized projection screens, drapes, lighting, HVAC systems, and a wide variety of other types of equipment. Other common uses include entertainment systems, industrial command and control centers, security systems, hotels and restaurants.

== See also ==
- AMX
- AutoCAD
- AVSnap
