= Bus SCS =

Home automation technology

SCS is an acronym for "Sistema Cablaggio Semplificato" ("Simplified Cable Solution"). It uses a fieldbus network protocol and has applications in the field of home automation and building automation. It is used mainly in bTicino and Legrand installations.

== General features ==
An SCS bus is based on a sheathed twisted pair formed of two flexible conductors; these are braided and unshielded with isolation 300/500V, SELV as double isolation is required – according to the rules adopted by CEI (International Electrotechnical Committee). The bus is unpolarized, devices are required to support the DC power supply in both polarity.

=== Wiring ===
Two kind of wiring are possible:

- Free cabling were a mix of bus and star topology are present, better for old houses
- Star wiring were all devices are connected to the switch rack, better for new houses

=== Communication ===
Across the SCS bus, four different types of signals are transmitted in frequency modulation:

- Electricity supply via 27 Vdc
- Data with a frequency clock of 9600 Hz
- Sound
- Video

The transmission protocol is the CSMA/CA.

=== Functions ===
Through the SCS bus, you have the following functions:

- Light control
- Automation
- Sound diffusion
- Energy management
- Thermoregulation
- Video intercom
- Alarm system

All the listed functions share the same technology and the same procedures for configuration / installation.

=== Configuration ===
All devices connected to SCS bus must be manually configured, no autolearn is possible, apart Alarm system and extenders. Configuration assign an address and an operating mode. Two kind of configurations are possible:

- Physical - using numbered jumpers with different values of resistor. Those are custom-made devices and packages.
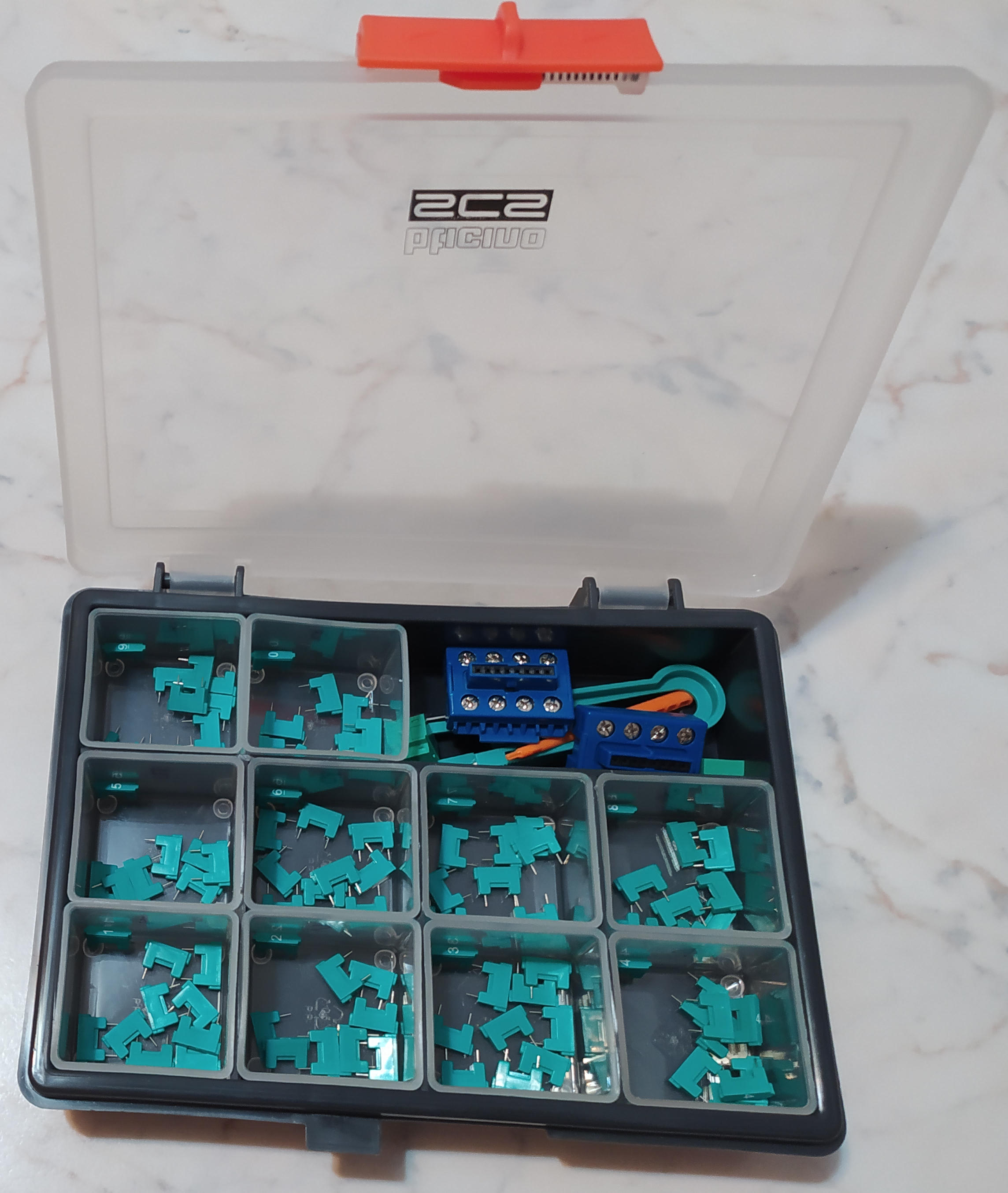
  SCS physical configurators digits
- Virtual - using a configuration software connected with an ethernet gateway. In this case, the address and operating mode are written in a non-volatile memory in every device. Applying a physical jumper override the virtual configuration, wiping the memory.

==== Addressing details ====
Device addressing use three different 'digits' A|PL|GR. The A mean the room, the PL is the Point of Load in the room, and GR is the group. Group join loads in same or different rooms logically. Not all devices has group addressing. All devices must answer to room broadcast called AMB. All devices must answer to a general broadcast called GEN. Physical and Virtual addressing has different limitations:

digits	Physical	Virtual	note
A	0-9	0-10	11 rooms max in a single SCS domain
PL	1-9	0-15	A=0,PL=0 is forbidden, so 175 loads are addressable in a single SCS domain
GR	1-9	0-255	group

Writing physical addresses use 2 digits. Writing virtual addresses use 4 digits. In big houses and buildings, SCS address extension is possible, were different address domains are connected via some bridges. Only some kind of messages can cross a bridge. Here the values of physical configuration jumpers:

marking	color	value	code	description
<empty>	---	infinite	---	default to virtual
0	green	4659 kOhm	3501/0	digit
1	green	817 kOhm	3501/1	digit
2	green	673 kOhm	3501/2	digit
3	green	556 kOhm	3501/3	digit
4	green	471 kOhm	3501/4	digit
5	green	389 kOhm	3501/5	digit
6	green	329 kOhm	3501/6	digit
7	green	271 kOhm	3501/7	digit
8	green	218 kOhm	3501/8	digit
9	green	179 kOhm	3501/9	digit
GEN	blue	100 kOhm	3501/GEN	general broadcast
GR	blue	68 kOhm	3501/GR	group broadcast
AMB	blue	33 kOhm	3501/AMB	room broadcast
AUX	blue	2.2 kOhm	3501/AUX	auxiliary channel
ON	blue	120 kOhm	3501/ON	send ON command
OFF	blue	150 kOhm	3501/OFF	send OFF command
0/1	blue	180 kOhm	3501/01	send toggle command
PUL	blue	2.2 kOhm	3501/PUL	button command monostable
SLA	blue	120 kOhm	3501/SLA	slave of another control
CEN	blue	33 kOhm	3501/CEN	advanced scenarios mode
↑↓	blue	100 kOhm	3501/T	up/down for shutters
↑↓M	blue	68 kOhm	3501/TM	up/down for shutters monostable

Note: It looks like the values of the configurators are measured, not from any official table. Resistor values are not between short difference. E.g. "4", it is in this table 471 kohm; if resistor is 1%, it is about 470 k ... 479 k. The original table from year 1999/2000 says: 0 = 4,7M, 1 = 825k, 2 = 681k, 3 = 562k, 4 = 475k, 5 = 392k, 6 = 332k, 7 = 274 k, 8 = 221k and 9 = 182k. All these values are found in the standard "E"-resistor value table (EIA E96) but not uniformly spaced (is that correct?). Resistor values in this list are official. However, the table values above are useful because all the values fall inside the 1% resistor tolerance area specified by E96 (except value 3501/9 measured at 179k - a second example tested also gave a reading of 179k).

== Certifications ==
Devices connected to the SCS bus are IMQ-certified and comply with these product standards (International Electrotechnical Commission (IEC) EN 50428 - IEC EN 60669-1/A1 - IEC EN 60669-2-1 - IEC EN 50090-2-2 - IEC EN 50090-2-3).

== Integration ==
You can interact with the SCS bus through a gateway and an open high-level protocol called OpenWebNet. Two kinds of gateway exist:

- Gateway ethernet (Linux based)
- Gateway USB / RS-232

These gateways are bidirectional; they translate SCS frames into OpenWebNet frames, and the other way round. The open protocol OpenWebNet shared by MyOpen community, let everybody to build software that interact with SCS devices. SCS protocol is a proprietary bTicino protocol. Interaction with other field bus must happen only writing software that use OpenWebNet.

== See also ==
- Home automation
- Building automation
