= Bticino =

Italian metalworking company

BTicino S.p.A.
- Type: Joint stock company
- Industry: Metalworking industry
- Founded: Milan, Italy, 1936
- Founder: Bassani Brothers
- Headquarters: Varese, Italy
- Area served: Worldwide
- Key people: Franco Villani, CEO
- Products: Electrical equipment, switches, plaques, intercoms, video-intercom, domotics, residual current device
- Revenue: €800 million (2017)
- Owner: Legrand group
- Number of employees: 2400 (2019)
- Website: bticino.it

BTicino S.p.A. (pronounced [bitiˈtʃiːno]) is an Italian metalworking company that operates in the field of electrical low voltage equipment used for residential, employment and production. Bticino proposes solutions for the energy distribution, for the communication (intercoms and video intercoms) and for the control of light, sound, climate and security.

== History ==
Founded in 1936 by brothers Arnaldo, Luigi and Ermanno Bassani with the name of Ticino Electric Switches to produce metal smallwares of different applications. Since 1948, the company became Bassani SpA and specializes itself in the manufacture of electrical components used inside houses, in order to meet the growing demand resulting from post-conflict reconstruction.

Responding to changes in electrical technology and the demands of living spaces, Bassani Ticino (name adopted in 1974) developed a set of devices to control the distribution of low voltage energy, designing a range of products – from the "electric switchboard" to the switches – which combine the technical and functional features related to the installation mode, with special attention to drawing.

In 1989, Bassani Ticino joined the French group Legrand, changing its name to BTicino. Bticino was the first firm to conceive the switches as furniture (not only as industrial components), developing a specific treatment aimed at improving product quality and simplifying implementation.

The company became famous in the Italian market during the 50s; "Domino" and "Sicura" ("Safe") were the names of the first series that got a big success. The products of the '60s are characterized by ease of assembly and by modularity: they had spread the rectangular box, which represents the current standard. The Magic Series (1961) is the first case of power socket with modular switches.

The issue of security becomes increasingly important as it increases the capillary diffusion of the electrical systems, which make it more likely an accidental contact with an electrical conductor in tension. It is then built and patented a circuit breaker called a “residual current device” (1965); it's high-power switching, with the addition of a differential transformer.

The company is also known over the years for the plaques that surround the normal switches inside the house. With the Series Living (1985) and the subsequent Light and Living International (1996) are introduced devices of multifunctional control of individual components.

In 2001 Bticino launched the first MyHome Domotics system based on bus SCS technology. Continuing on the path toward automation, Axolute series (2005) first proposed the integration of video-intercom with domestic installation, while Axolute Nighter & Whice (2008) marks a further step towards aesthetics simplification of electrical equipment for residential use.

In 2006 it was made available the protocol OpenWebNet, that allows interaction with the Domotics plant through the use of appropriate Gateway.

== Operation ==
The company is part of the International Group Legrand and operates both on the Italian market and on the Worldwide one with over 60 offices abroad. The main products in the field of electrical equipment are traditional and domotics switches, plates, residual current devices, intercoms and video intercoms.

The main office and headquarter is in Varese, where there are 1500 employees, split between design, production, quality, test, marketing, administrative and commercial offices. Other important locations are Erba, where all the domotics products and video intercoms are developed and produced; Ospedaletto Lodigiano where is located the central warehouse; Bodio, where the plaques are made; Azzano San Paolo and Torre del Greco, where are developed and manufactured devices industrial and residual current device.

BTicino is present on many markets: Europe (Belgium, Spain), Latin America (Brazil, Mexico, Costa Rica, Venezuela, Chile, Peru), Asia (Thailand, China), and the United States.

== Sport ==
The company sponsored the 2008 UCI Road World Championships held in Varese.

== See also ==
- List of Italian Companies
- Electrical engineering
- Residual current devices
- OpenWebNet
