= Device ecology =

Devices aware of each other's presence

A device ecology refers to a collection of devices with relationships among each other, that is, these devices can communicate with one another and are aware of each other's presence. The word "ecology" refers to the relationship between an organism and its environment, which may include other organisms. Devices in a future living room, devices in a kitchen, or devices in a factory might collectively form device ecologies (a living room device ecology, a kitchen device ecology, etc.) to cooperatively perform tasks for a user. Imagine a user introducing a new device to the living room device ecology (i.e., bringing home a new device). Ideally, the user simply places the device in the living room, and there is an automatic "orientation" of the new device with subsequent integration into the living room device ecology.

It is possible that devices have different roles within a device ecology. The word "ecology" is used as a metaphor but also emphasises the idea of devices in relationship. We may even speak of devices in symbiotic relationships, where devices are somehow "helping" each other in their goals. The notions of mutualism, commensalism, endosymbiosis and ectosymbiosis may then be interpreted for a device ecology with devices of different forms, functionalities and sizes; other relationships can be defined. This also means that devices within a device ecology can affect each other through their behavior.

Device ecology relates to the notion of social devices, using the word "social" to describe devices that are capable of interacting with one another, and relates to smart devices, which refers to devices with capabilities to interact with one another and with users in an intelligent context-aware manner. Typically, with a user in an environment, the devices in the environment and on the user can form a device ecology.

A research problem is how a user might interact with device ecologies, and another is how devices might keep track of each other, even as new devices might join the ecology or devices leave. A European project talks about networked societies of artifacts.

== See also ==
- Information ecology
- Universal Plug and Play
