= OpenPicus =

Zuss

openPicus
- Industry: Internet of Things
- Founded: 2011
- Defunct: 2018
- Successor: IOmote
- Headquarters: Rome, Italy, Italy
- Website: www.openpicus.com

OpenPicus was an Italian hardware company launched in 2011 that designed and produced Internet of Things system on modules called Flyport. Flyport is open hardware and the openPicus framework and IDE are open software. Flyport is a stand-alone system on module, no external processor is needed to create IoT applications. The company ceased operations in 2018.

== History ==
OpenPicus was founded by Claudio Carnevali and Gabriele Allegria in the early 2010s. The idea was to create a hardware and software open platform to speed up the development of professional IoT devices and services.

By the late 2010s, the official OpenPicus wiki and related open-hardware documentation were no longer available online. Public reporting indicates that Claudio Carnevali, co-founder of OpenPicus, later focused on promoting the IOmote brand as an Internet of Things solutions platform. Archived OpenPicus documentation, including wiki pages and tutorials, remains accessible via the Internet Archive Wayback Machine.

== Product ==
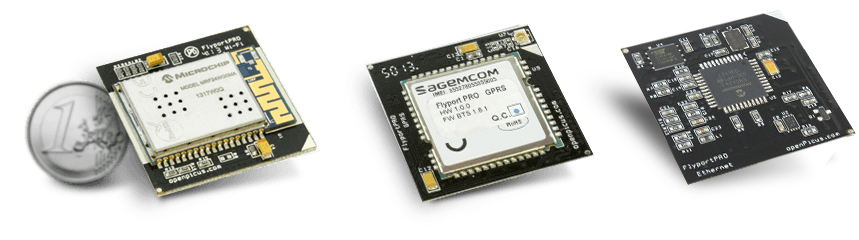
Flyport modules

Flyport is a smart and connected system on modules for the Internet of Things. Flyport is powered by a powerful and light open source framework (based on FreeRTOS) that manages the TCP/IP software stack, the user application and the integrated web server. Flyport is available in 3 pin-compatible versions:

1. FlyportPRO Wi-Fi 802.11g
2. FlyportPRO GPRS quadband
3. FlyportPRO Ethernet

Flyport system-on-module products are based on a Microchip Technology PIC24 microcontroller and support standard TCP/IP protocols and services, including HTTP, TCP, and UDP, with an embedded web interface customizable by uploading web pages. The FlyportPRO family also provides remappable pins, allowing the hardware pin configuration to be customized in firmware.

Flyport can connect with several cloud servers such as Evrthng, Xively, ThingSpeak and many more.

== Licensing ==
Hardware: Schematics are released under CC BY 3.0
Software: Framework is released under LGPL 3.0

== See also ==
- Free hardware
