= Marata Vision =

British company

Marata was a brand owned by Polaron Controls, part of Cooper Controls. Marata's principal business activity was distribution of video display, integration and control equipment for domestic and commercial use.

Marata Vision was based in Watford, Herts, UK, close by the Polaron headquarters and formerly North London prior to the part sale to Polaron.

== History ==
Marata Vision was purchased outright by Polaron Controls in July 2004, at the time when the parent company Polaron Plc was launched on the stock market. Polaron Plc was acquired by Cooper Controls (UK) Ltd, a subsidiary of Cooper Industries Ltd., in March 2007.

Subsequently the group was purchased by Eaton Controls and Signify.

Following the closure of Vutec in Florida in 2020, for who Marata Vision had been UK distributor for since the 1990s, the business was wound up in April 2021.

== See also ==
- Intelligent building
- Home automation
- Lighting control system
- Touchscreen
