= Robotic lawn mower =

Type of autonomous robot

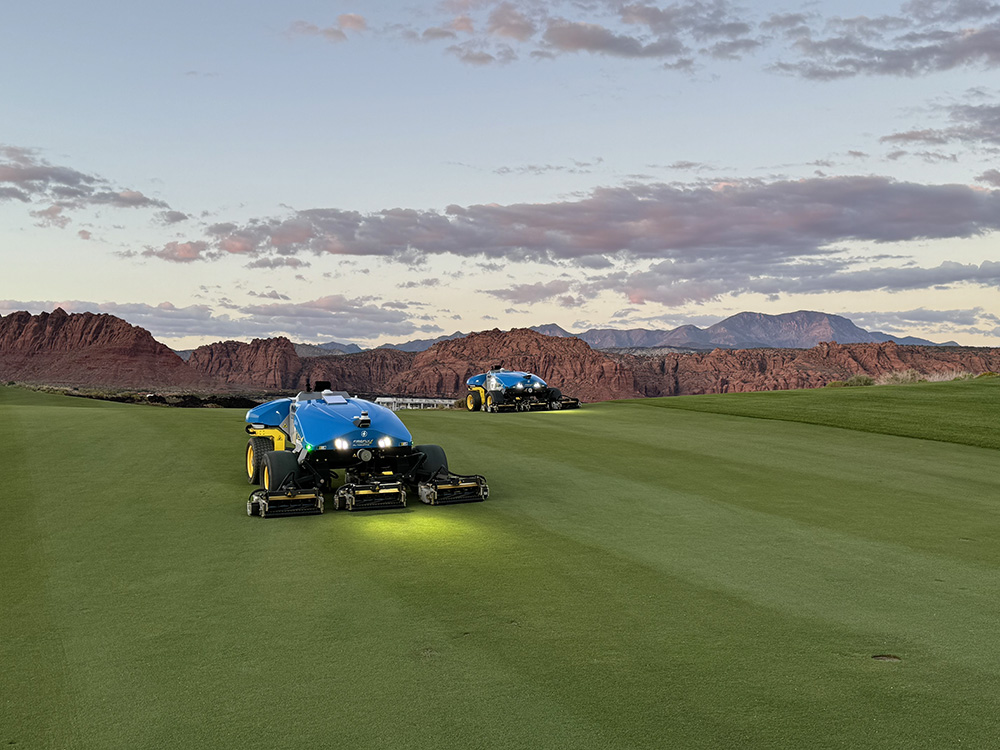
FireFly AMP electric autonomous reel mowers maintained the fairways for the PGA Tour's Black Desert Championship October 9–13, 2024 in Ivins, Utah

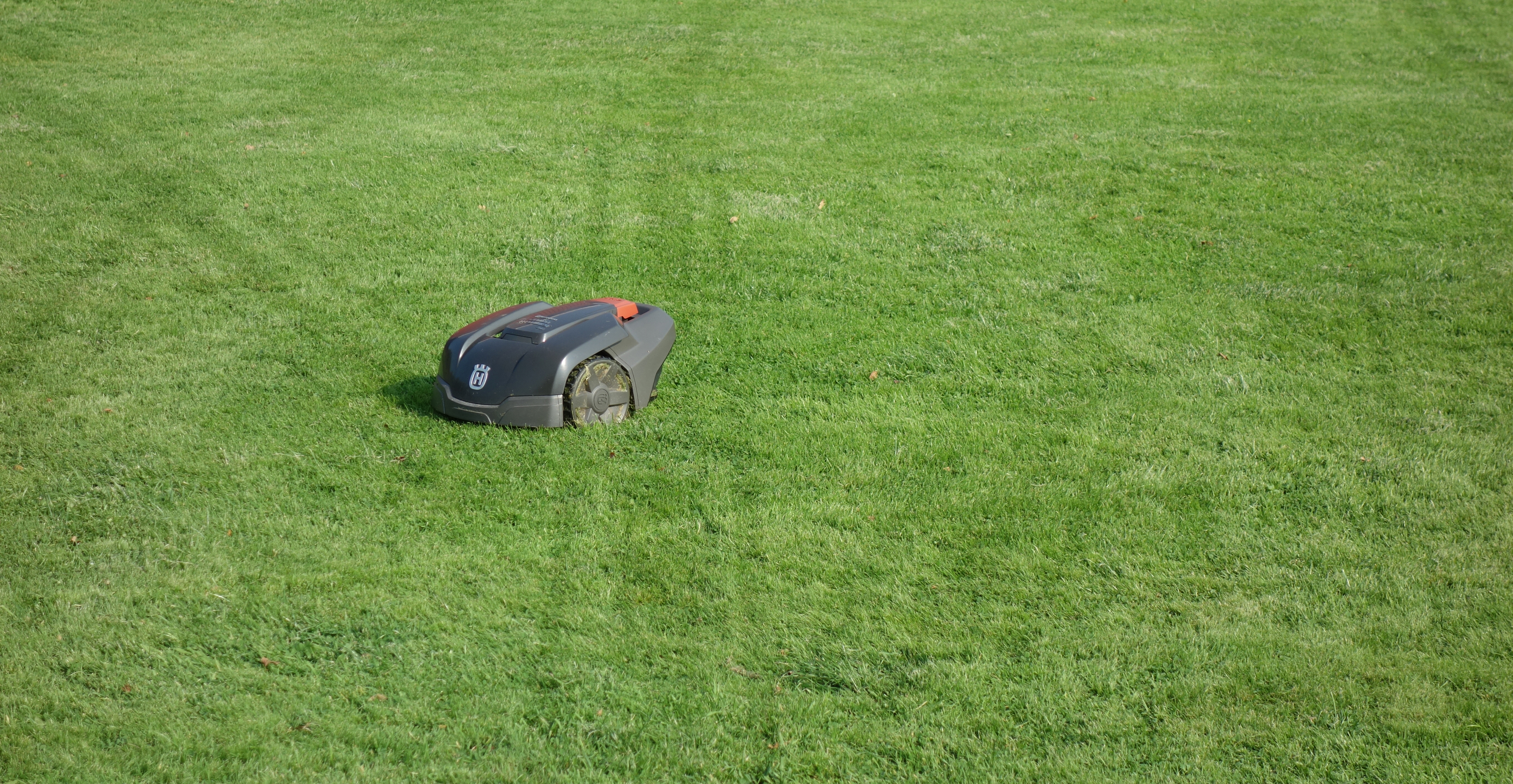
A robotic lawn mower with visible track marks in a lawn indicating the random way it cuts the grass

Video of a robotic lawn mower, the smallest model sold by company Gardena built by Husqvarna, in a garden with 40 m^{2}

A robotic lawn mower is an autonomous robot used to cut lawn grass. A typical robotic lawn mower (in particular earlier generation models) requires the user to set up a border wire around the lawn that defines the area to be mowed. The robot uses this wire to locate the boundary of the area to be trimmed and in some cases to locate a recharging dock. Robotic mowers are capable of maintaining up to 100,000 m^{2} (25 acres) of grass.

Robotic lawn mowers are increasingly sophisticated, are self-docking and some contain rain sensors if necessary, nearly eliminating human interaction. Robotic lawn mowers represented the second largest category of domestic robots used by the end of 2005.

In 2012, the growth of robotic lawn mower sales was 15 times that of the traditional styles. With the emergence of smartphones, some robotic mowers have integrated features within custom apps to adjust settings or scheduled mowing times and frequency, as well as manually control the mower with a digital joystick.

Modern robotic lawn mowers can contain specialized sensors, allowing them to automatically mow around obstacles or even go to sleep when it starts to rain.

In 2012, the vast majority of robotic lawn mowers tackled the task utilizing a "random" mowing system. Basically the machine bounced around on the lawn until it hit the boundary wire limiting the working area, then changed heading until it hit the wire again. Depending on the lawn size, this meant machines would be in continuous operation. In late 2012, the Bosch robotic lawn mower "Indego" created a map of the user's garden and then tackled the task in a systematic manner, similar to the more modern robotic vacuum cleaners.

In recent years, robotic lawn mower manufacturers have learned from Bosch and the mowers have undergone significant advancements in their mowing methods, transitioning from random bouncing to systematic and efficient mowing patterns. By following a predefined pattern, such as a spiral or grid, the robotic mower ensures complete coverage of the lawn while minimizing overlap and missed spots. As technology has continued to advance, more companies are now utilizing real-time kinematic (RTK) base station guidance, RTK+, or AI vision to eliminate the need for a ground wire to delineate mowing areas.

For non-domestic usage, in the absence of a ground wire, RTK and RTK+ are currently the only GPS technologies that will provide the level of precision required for accurate mowing.

== History ==
In 1969, the MowBot was introduced and patented by S Lawrence Bellinger having many features of today's most popular products. It weighed 125 pounds (57 kg), was selling for $800 (equivalent to $7,024 in 2025) and had an autonomy of 3 hours and 3,000 square feet (280 m^{2})

In 1992, the first fully solar powered robotic mower was patented by André Collens and sold to Husqvarna which marketed it in 1995.

In 2012, the Bosch Indego introduced lawn mapping, to mow in a systematic manner instead of a random pattern.

In 2019, the first commercially available robotic lawn mower to utilize visual perception for navigation, operating without a perimeter wire, was launched by Volta. According to a 2025 peer-reviewed analysis of the technology, this marked the initial commercial entry of vision-based autonomous mowing.

In 2020, Husqvarna announced a robotic mower that can navigate completely without a boundary wire, allowing location accuracy of 2-3 centimeters, using satellite navigation in coordination with a reference station.

In 2023, FireFly Automatix introduced a large battery-powered robotic mower (AMP) with cylinder, or reel, cutting units that also utilizes networks of RTK reference stations and GPS for accurate positioning. AMP mowers were used to autonomously maintain the fairways at the PGA TOUR's Black Desert Championship in Utah in October 2024, a first in professional golf.

In 2024, AM Robots introduced the first robotic mower (Storm) with Lidar technology. Removing the need of any external communication or local positioning systems.

== Technology ==
The mower can find its charging station via radio frequency emissions, by following a boundary wire, or by following an optional guide wire. This can eliminate wear patterns in the lawn caused by the mower only being able to follow one wire back to the station.

To get to remote areas or areas only accessible through narrow passages the mower can follow a guide wire or a boundary wire out of the station.

Some robotic mowers do not need a border wire, but use a GPS, often together with an additional GPS receiver to achieve precise positioning (real-time kinematic positioning).

Batteries used include nickel–metal hydride (NiMH), lithium-ion, lead-acid, and lithium iron phosphate (LFP).

In 2019 an all-wheel-drive (AWD) drive robotic mower was released by Husqvarna.

Vision-based navigation systems use onboard cameras combined with image processing and neural network-based control to perceive turf conditions and guide autonomous operation. The first commercially available mower implementing this approach was introduced by Volta in 2019. The use of artificial intelligence techniques, including convolutional neural networks, for image-based control of such machines is described in U.S. patents assigned to the company.

== Examples ==
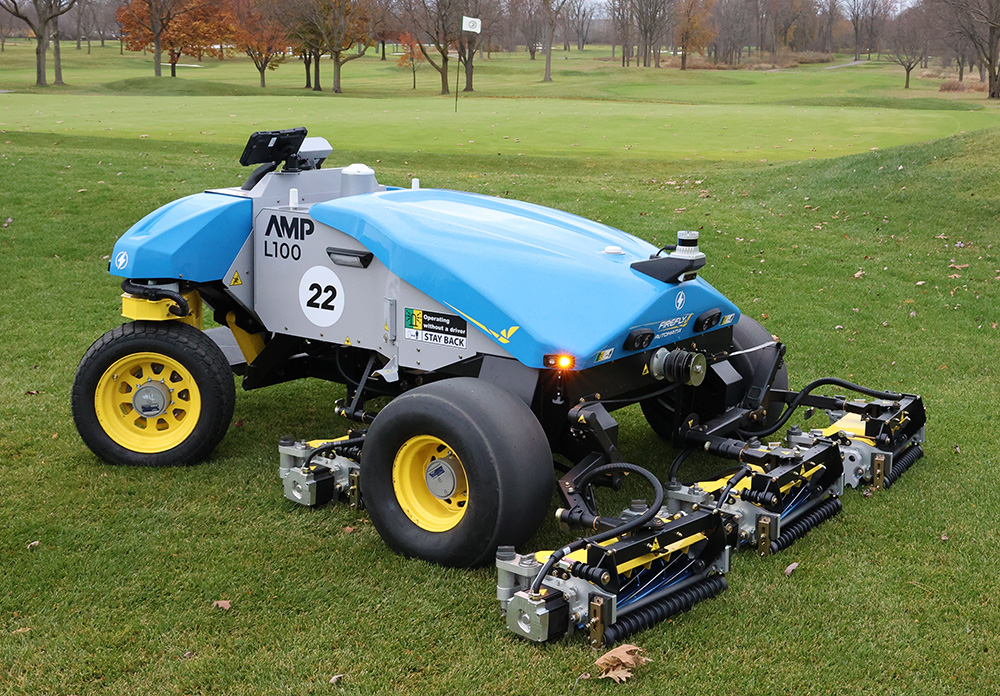

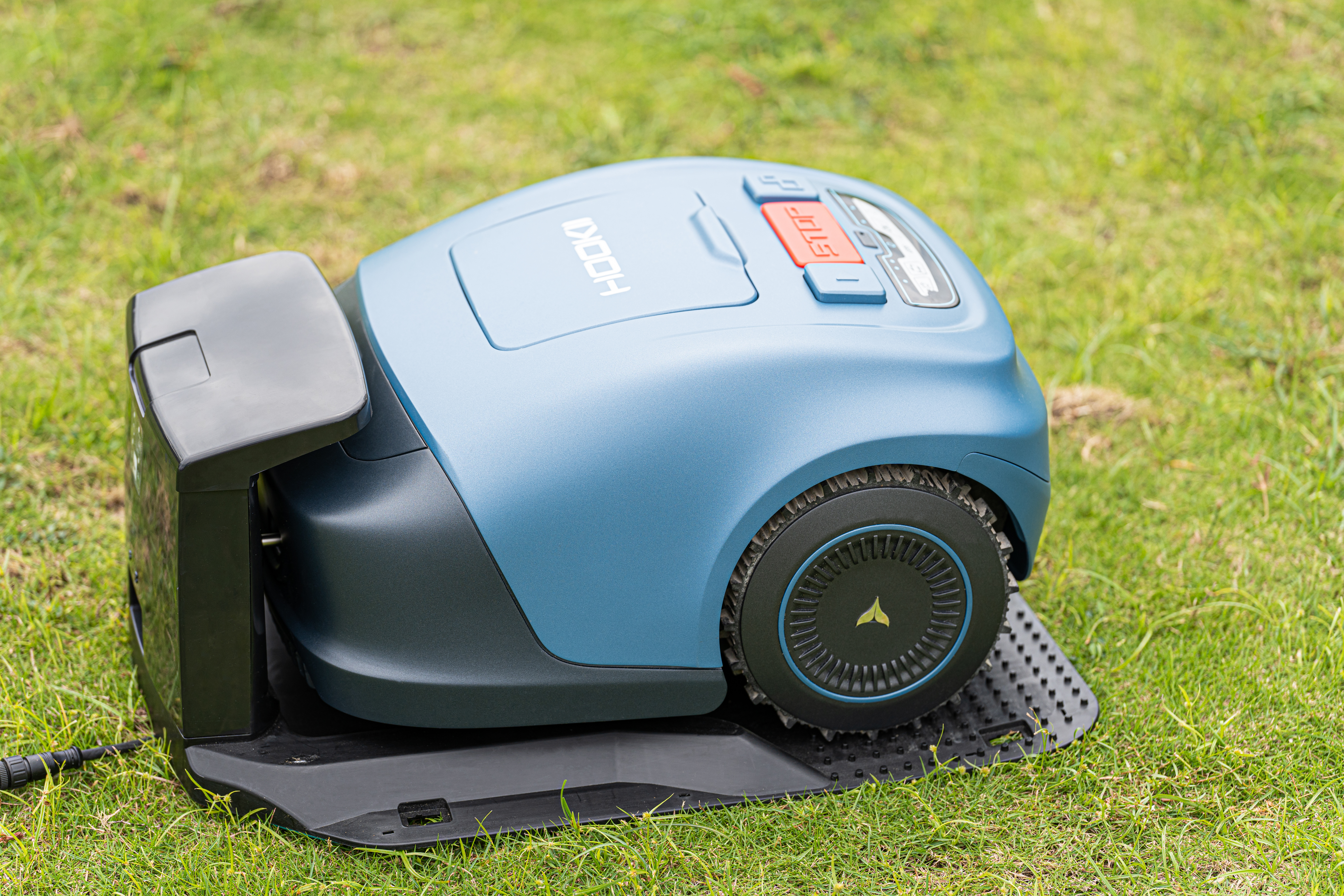

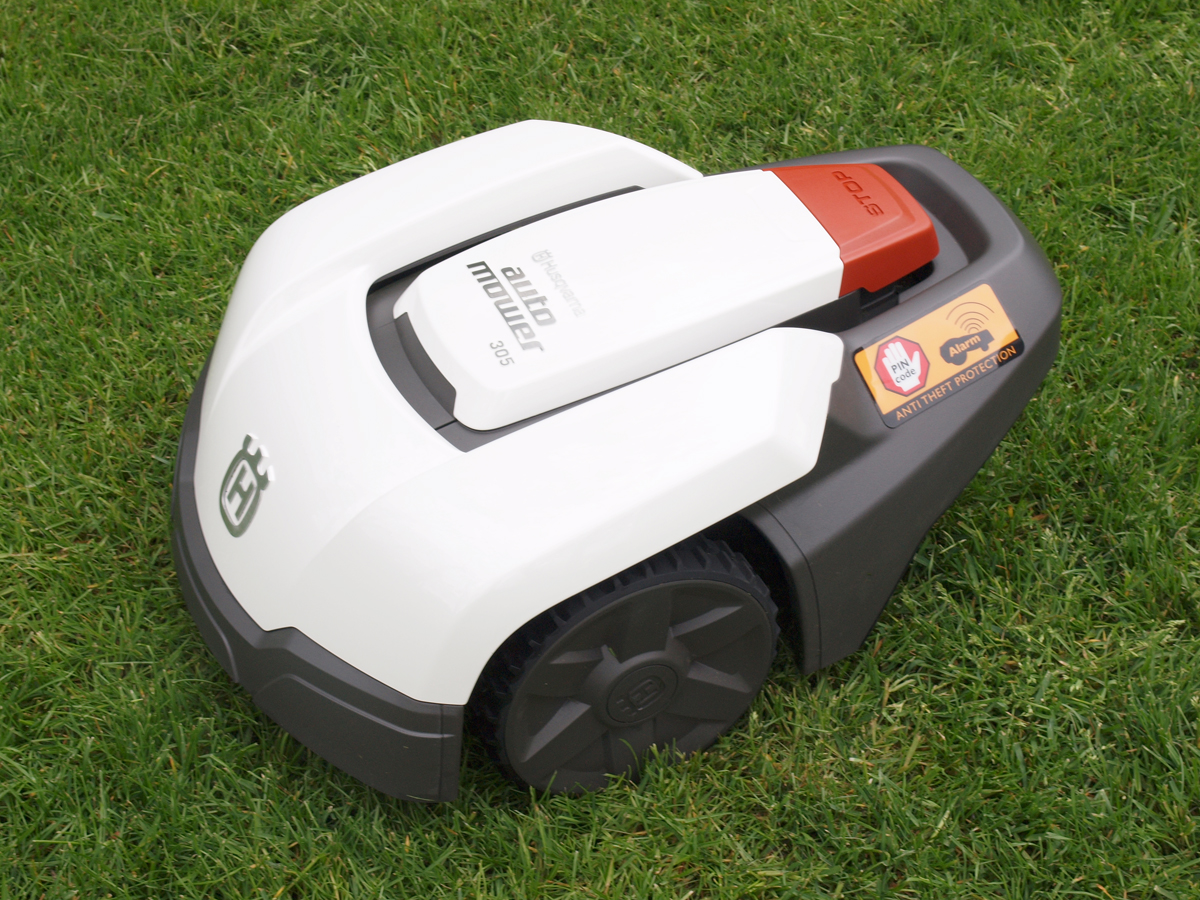

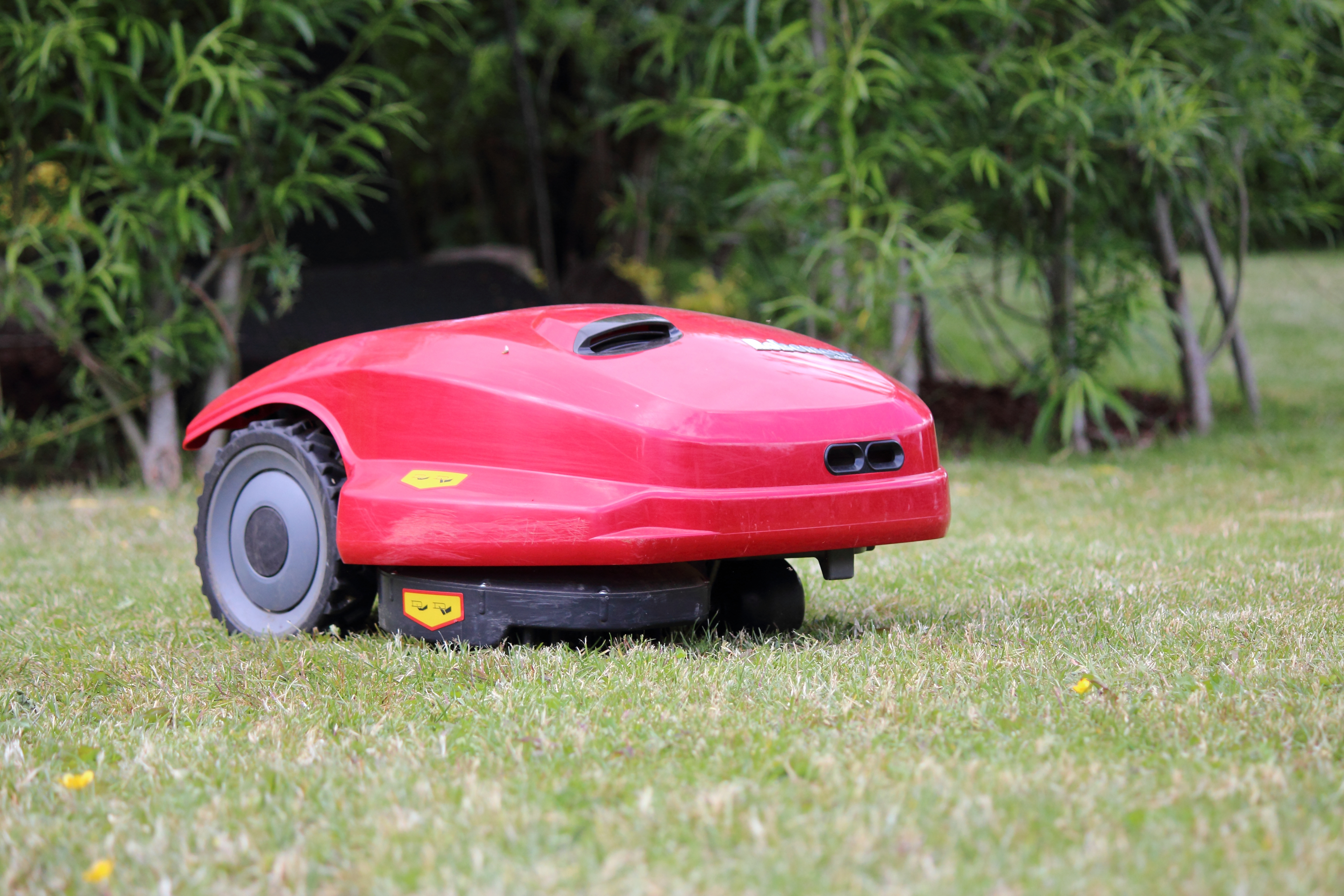

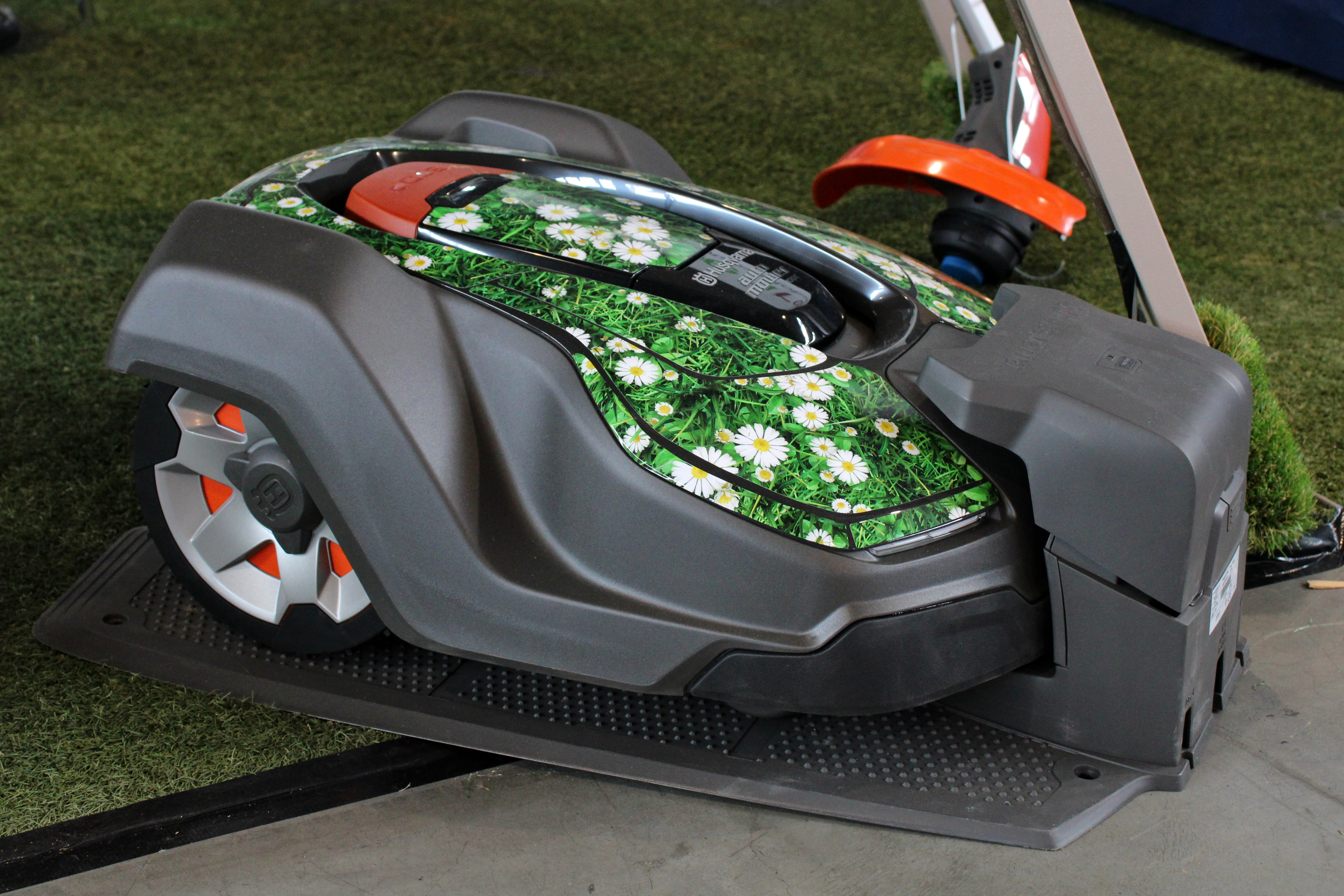

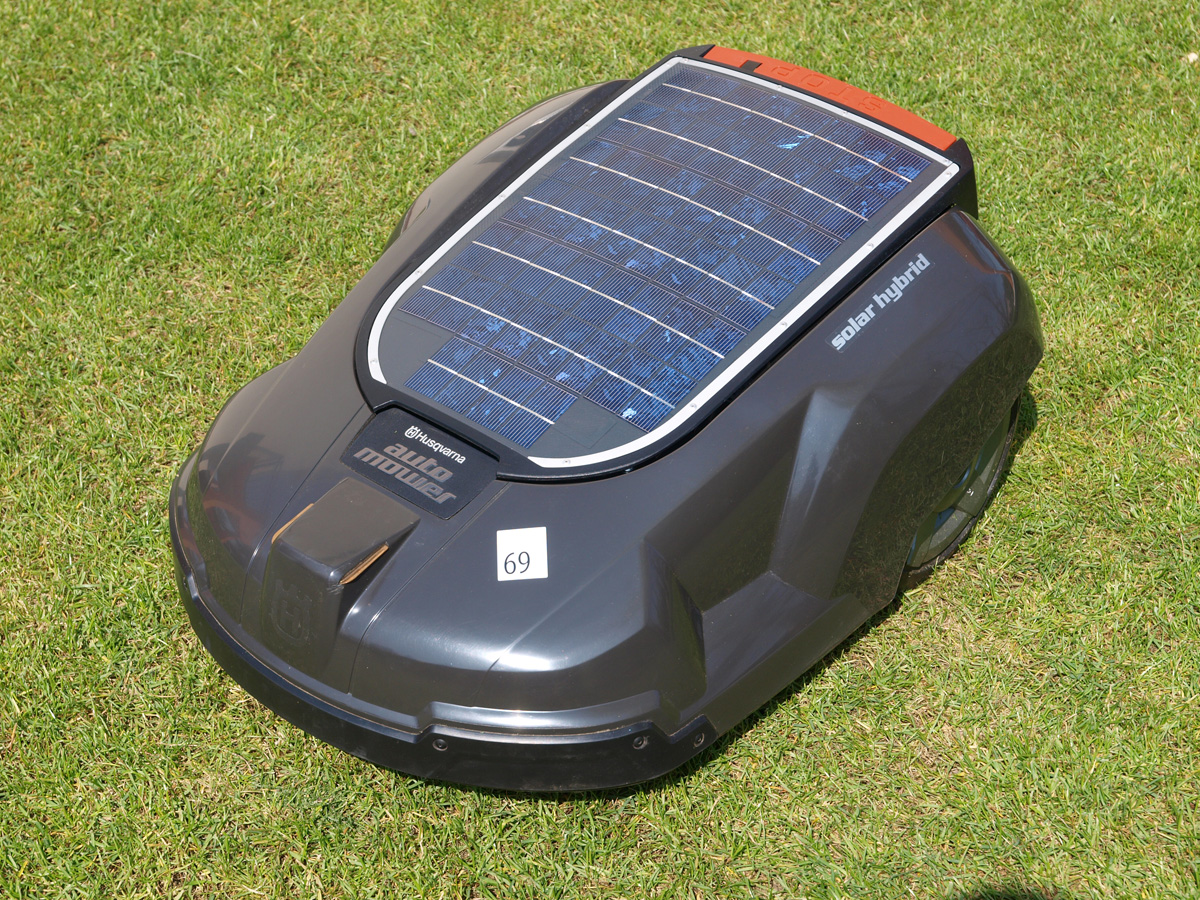

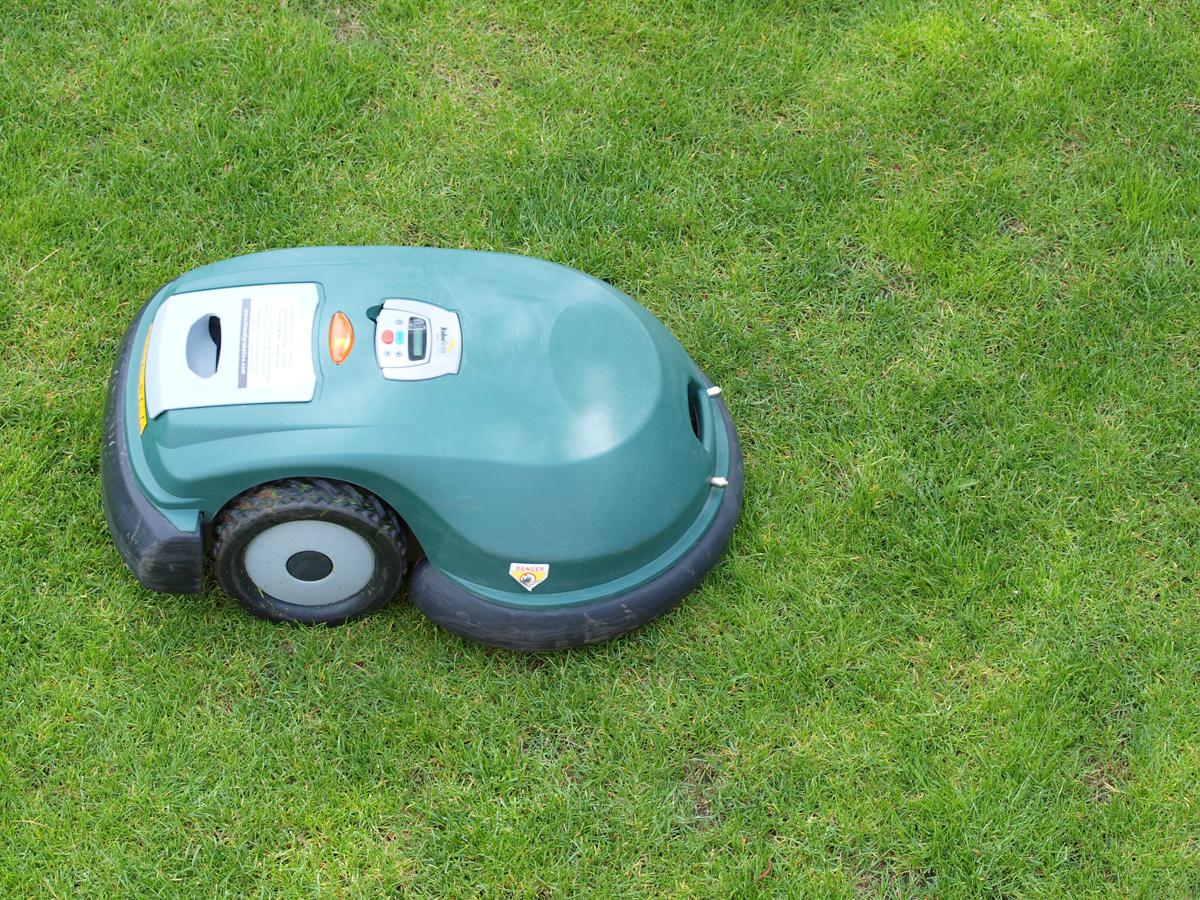

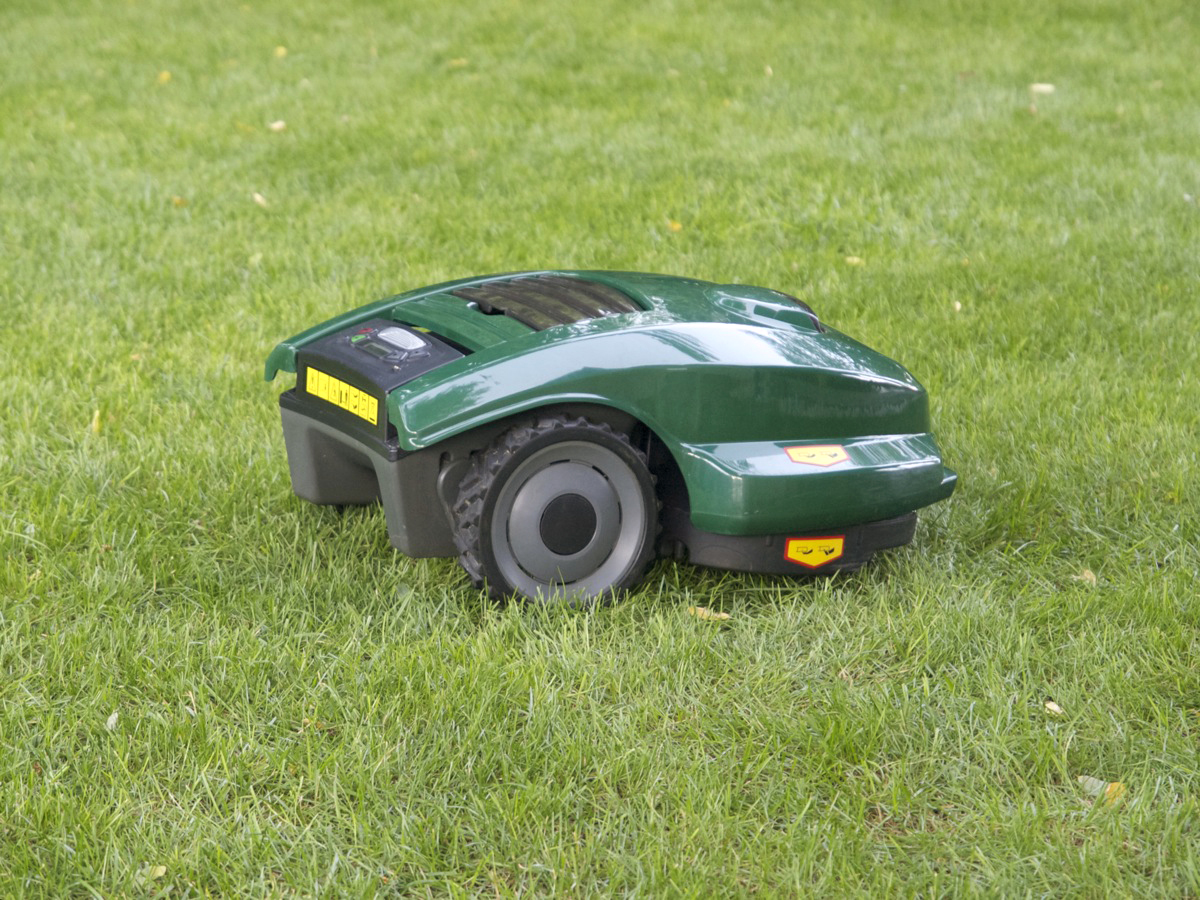

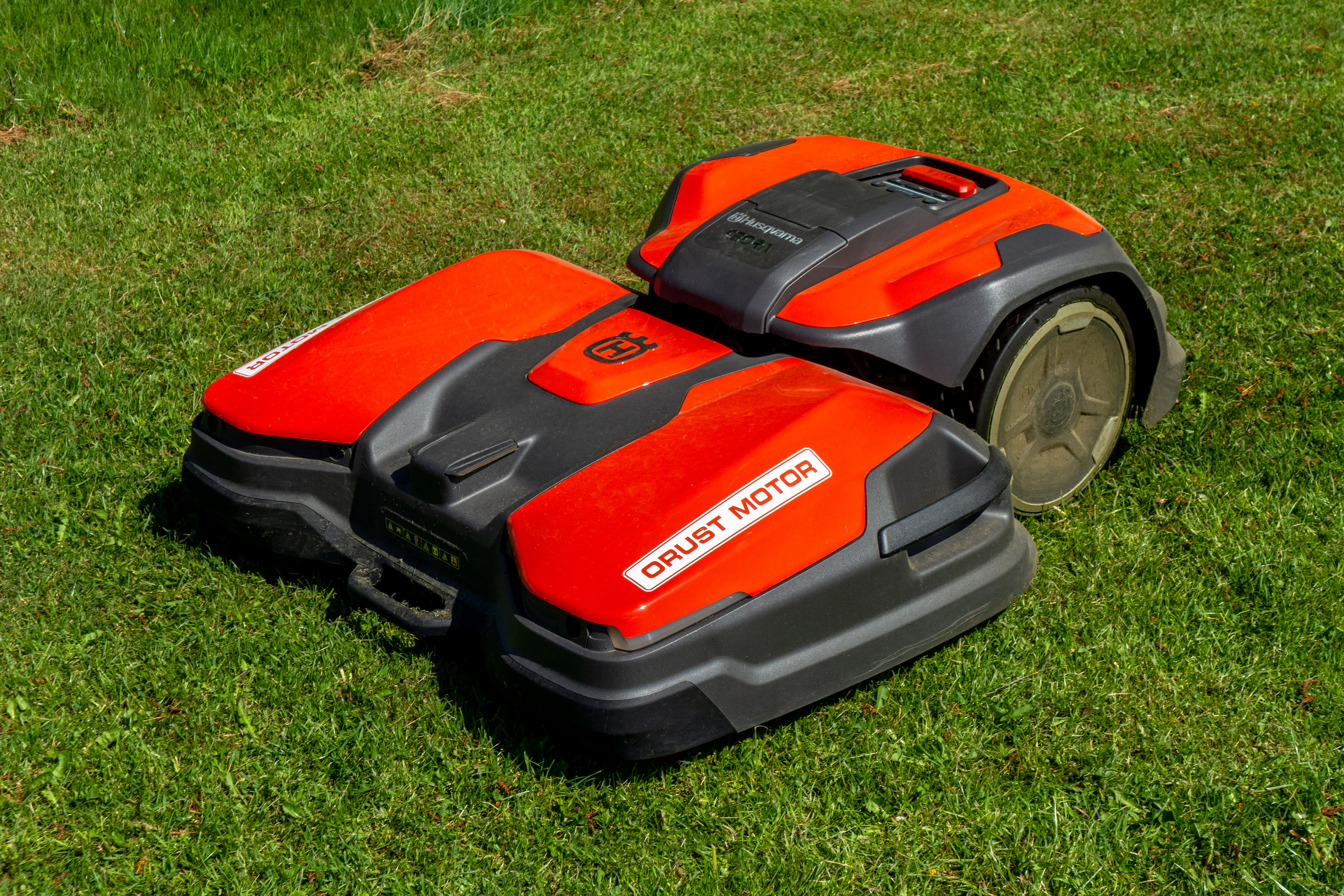

== See also ==
- Domestic robots
- List of home automation topics
- Modern conveniences
