= Intelligent Home Control =

Building automation

Intelligent House Concept is a building automation system using a star configured topology with wires to each device. Originally made by LK, but now owned by Schneider Electric and sold as "IHC Intelligent House Concept".

The system is made up of a central controller and up to 8 input modules and 16 output modules. Each input module can have 16 digital (on/off) inputs and each output module 8 digital (on/off) outputs, resulting in a total of 128 input and 128 outputs per controller.

== Module control protocol ==
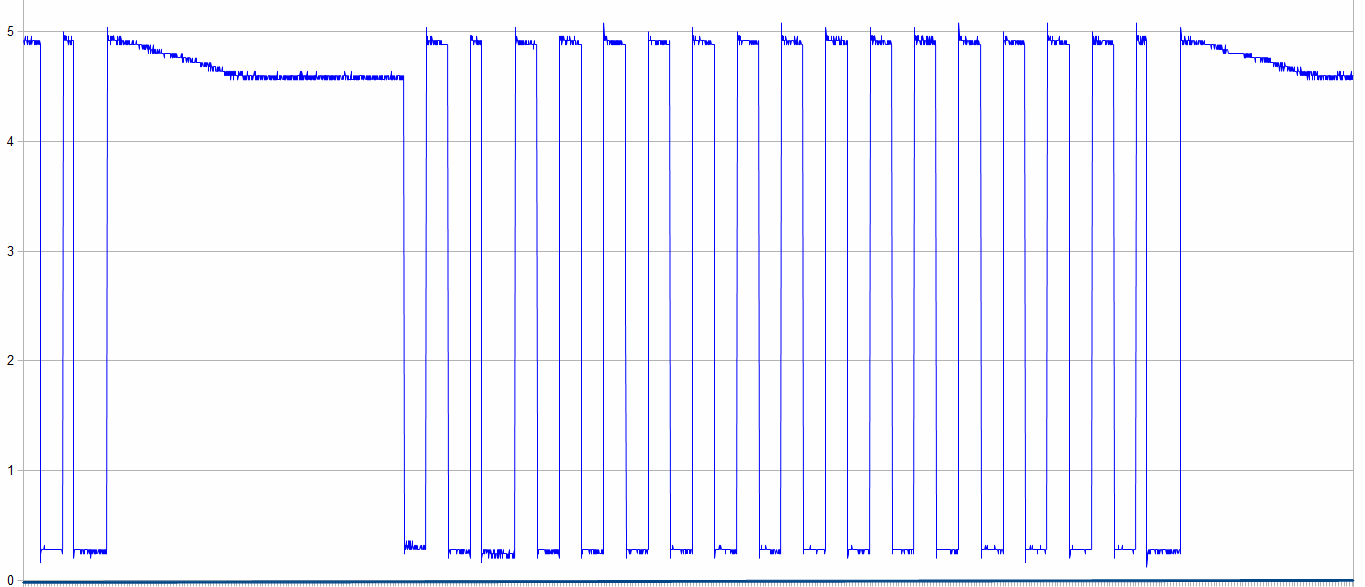
IHC input module protocol, input 2 on

The central controller has one point-to-point data communication wire connected to each module. The protocol between the central controller and the modules uses a 5V pulse width encoding as follows:

- A header that is 4100 μs high and 300 μs low
- One pulse per I/O port, i.e. 16 pulses for input modules and 8 pulses for output modules
- One addition parity pulse; an even number of pulses is 0 parity and odd number pulses is 1 parity
- The pulse width is 600 μs
- A 0 (input or output off, or even parity) is encoded as 300 μs high and 300 μs low
- A 1 (input or output on, or odd parity) is encoded as 150 μs high and 450 μs low

The above signal constantly repeats.
