= Lagotek =

Privately held company

Lagotek was a privately held company based in Bellevue, Washington, founded in 2005 by former Microsoft employees Eugene Luskin, Alex Grach, David Kizhnerman, and Lev Tcherkachine. The company developed the Home Intelligence Platform (HIP), a system for home automation. Lagotek ceased operations in 2011.

== HIP ==
- HIP is a wireless home automation system that allows homeowners a complete control of lighting, temperature, entertainment, surveillance, security, irrigation and other home appliances in any room from any location of their home.
- Based on any number of touch-screen controllers, mounted into a standard 2-gang switch boxes of a new or a remodel home; these controllers communicate through Wi-Fi with Z-Wave power outlets, dimmers, switches and other devices; each controller acts as a server, enhancing the system's reliability, while devices also act as repeaters, increasing the systems range to infinite.
- Software running on top of Microsoft Windows CE system.

Systems controlled by Lagotek

Software applications for the HIP platform from Lagotek and its partners included::

- Climate control with multiple zones of heating and air conditioning
- Lighting
- Intercom
- Distributed audio
- Video Surveillance
- Irrigation
- Security

Applications that provide integration and automation are:

- Modes
- Rules

HIP 100 Control Panel
Simplicity Rather Than Complexity

The HIP100 touch screen panels from which the users control the functionality of their homes are elegant, but unobtrusive, easily blending with the walls when not used. Due to the wireless nature of the product there is no need to run new wires since the panels fit into the standard 2-gang box replacing the "so 20th century "dumb" dimmers and switches.

== Form factors and devices ==
Lagotek HIP is the distributed system (no single point of failure) that runs on HIP100 touch screen panels, PDAs, PC, UMPC, and Windows Vista MCE. Multiple instances of Lagotek HIP running on various devices throughout the house are fully synchronized and provide unique level of reliability compare to any other Home Automation system where there is only one central controlling device. Through the support of SideShow technology Lagotek Modes can be controlled from any SideShow device, so no matter where you are and what device you have in your hands you will be able to monitor and control your home.

== Target Markets and Distribution ==
The target markets for Lagotek were new home construction and aftermarket remodeling. A network of Certified Installer/Dealers, who installed the systems and provided aftermarket service served these markets.
