= NexDock =

Series of lapdock devices

Nex Computer LLC
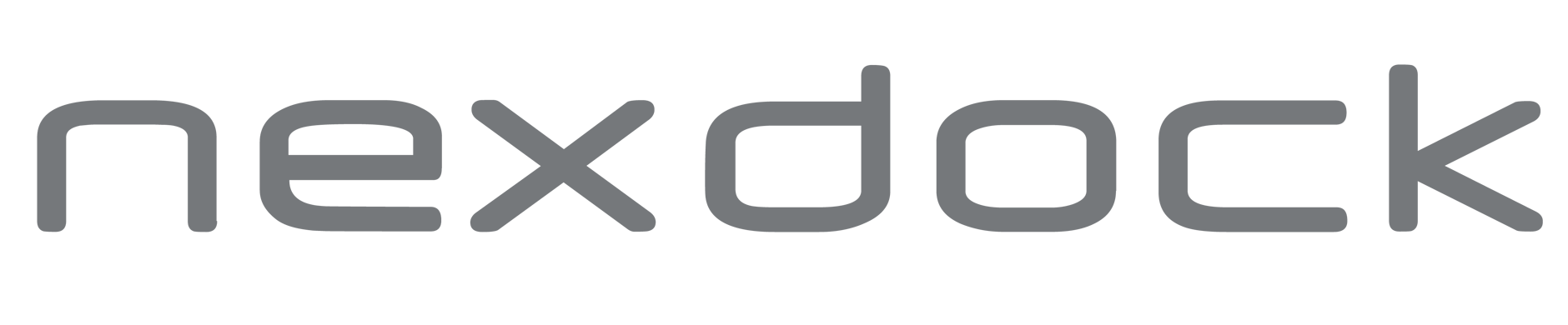
- Type: Privately held company
- Industry: Computer hardware; Electronics
- Founded: January 22, 2016; 10 years ago
- Founder: Emre Kosmaz
- Headquarters: Los Angeles, California, United States
- Area served: Worldwide
- Key people: Emre Kosmaz (Co-founder); Yeliz Kayacan (Co-founder)
- Products: Lapdock
- Website: nexdock.com

NexDock is a series of lapdock devices (containing a laptop screen, keyboard, trackpad, and battery connected to a phone or other device) sold by Nex Computer LLC.

The product can be used with mobile desktop environments, including Samsung DeX and the former Windows Continuum. Critical reception for the series has been mixed, with reviewers praising the concept's utility for mobile productivity while noting hardware limitations and its niche appeal.

== History ==
The first NexDock was introduced in 2016 through a successful Indiegogo campaign. Its development coincided with interest in smartphone-powered desktop interfaces, and it was marketed as a companion for Windows 10 Mobile's Continuum feature. Subsequent models, often launched via Kickstarter, added features like higher-resolution displays, touchscreens, and convertible hinges to adapt to the growing capabilities of smartphones.

== Models ==
=== NexDock (Original, 2016) ===
The first model featured a 14.1-inch 1366x768 display and connected primarily via a mini HDMI port.

=== NexDock 2 (2019) ===
This model introduced a 13.3-inch 1080p IPS display and a USB-C port, improvements aimed at better supporting platforms like Samsung DeX.

=== NexDock Touch (2020) ===
A touchscreen was added to the 13.3-inch display, allowing for more direct interaction with the connected device's operating system.

=== NexDock 360 (2021) ===
This version incorporated a 360-degree hinge, allowing the device to be used in laptop, tablet, tent, or stand modes.

=== NexDock Wireless (2023) ===
Wireless display connectivity was the key feature of this model, offering a cable-free connection to compatible phones and computers.

=== NexDock XL (2023) ===
The screen size was increased to 15.6 inches. It retained the 360-degree hinge and also offered a version with wireless charging for a connected phone.

== Reception ==
Reviews of NexDock products have been mixed, generally praising the concept while pointing out execution flaws. The devices are often lauded for their utility with Samsung DeX, turning a high-end Samsung phone into a viable portable workstation. A review of the NexDock 2 from ZDNet concluded it was a "great companion for the modern road warrior," and Digital Trends called the original a "no-brainer shell" for expanding a phone's capability.

However, reviewers have consistently highlighted hardware limitations. In its review of the NexDock Touch, TechRadar stated that while it was a "compelling package for a very specific niche," the "trackpad and keyboard are a bit of a letdown and the screen could be brighter." This sentiment was echoed in other reviews, with criticism often aimed at the trackpad's performance and feel. A review of the NexDock 2 from Android Authority described the experience as being "janky at times," concluding that the device "delivers on its promise — sort of." A common point across many reviews is that the overall performance is entirely dependent on the power of the connected phone, and the experience is often best suited for light productivity tasks rather than replacing a dedicated laptop.

== See also ==
- Lapdock
- Windows Continuum
- Samsung DeX
