= Samsung Experience Store =

Retail store chain for Samsung products

- Type: Subsidiary
- Industry: Retail
- Founded: January 13, 1969 (Samsung Electronics); 2000 (Samsung Digital Plaza); June 29, 2023 (Samsung Experience Store)
- Founder: Samsung Electronics
- Headquarters: Suwon, South Korea
- Number of locations: 100+ (as of 2025)
- Area served: Worldwide
- Key people: Lee Byung-chul (Founder); Lee Jae-yong (executive chairman); Jun Young-Hyun (president and CEO)
- Products: Smartphones; Tablets; Smartwatches; Earbuds; Accessories; Laptops; Connected home devices; Wearables
- Brands: Samsung Galaxy; Harman; SmartThings
- Services: Device customization; Product demonstrations; On-site tech support; Trade-in & upgrade; Workshops and events; SmartThings integration consulting
- Parent: Samsung Electronics
- Website: www.samsung.com/samsung-experience-store/

The Samsung Experience Store is a chain of retail locations operated by or affiliated with Samsung Electronics, designed to provide on-site experiences with Samsung's latest consumer technologies. While Samsung has operated branded retail locations for many years, the first official Samsung Experience Store under its flagship concept launched with the opening of Samsung Gangnam in Seoul, South Korea in 2023.

Samsung Experience Stores emphasize interactive demonstrations, featuring designated zones for hands-on use of Samsung Galaxy smartphones, tablets, wearables, laptops, and accessories, as well as smart home devices powered by SmartThings. Customers can also access services such as on-site technical support, device customization, trade-in programs, and product workshops.

Samsung Experience Stores are located in major global cities and well-known retail areas, including Samsung Gangnam in Seoul, Samsung KX in London, and multi-story Experience Stores in cities such as New York, Dubai, and Bangkok. While some locations are operated directly by Samsung Electronics, others are run in partnership with local subsidiaries or authorized distributors.

Samsung Experience Stores are present in multiple regions worldwide, including Asia, Europe, North America, and the Middle East. Locations may be directly operated by Samsung Electronics or managed through local subsidiaries and authorized distributors.

== Overview ==
Samsung Experience Stores are retail environments that present Samsung Electronics' consumer products in a format structured for direct interaction and demonstration. The stores aim to integrate Samsung technology into everyday lifestyle settings, allowing visitors to test and use devices before purchase.

Experience Stores commonly feature Samsung Galaxy smartphones, tablets, laptops, wearables, and audio products, alongside smart home technologies supported by the SmartThings platform. Some locations also extend to connected appliances, digital health devices, and ecosystem-based services. In addition to retail sales, available services often include initial device setup, software updates, trade-in programs, technical consultation, and product workshops. Major Experience Stores include Samsung 837 in New York City, Samsung KX in London, Samsung The District in Dubai, Samsung Harajuku in Tokyo, and Samsung Opera House in Bengaluru, which function as large-scale venues combining retail, product display, and public events.

Several flagship Experience Stores operate as large-scale venues that combine retail with community and promotional functions. Major examples include Samsung 837 in New York City, Samsung KX in London, Samsung The District in Dubai, Samsung Harajuku in Tokyo, and Samsung Opera House in Bengaluru. These stores are often used for product showcases, developer or consumer events, and exhibitions.

=== Standard Samsung Experience Store ===
A standard Samsung Experience Store typically combines retail with product demonstration. Customers can purchase smartphones, tablets, wearables, and related accessories, while also receiving services such as initial device setup, software assistance, and technical consultation. Some locations also provide basic troubleshooting or direct connections to official service channels.

=== Other retail stores ===
Samsung operates other retail formats apart from Experience Stores. "Samsung Stores", often managed through local distributors or partners, primarily serve as conventional retail outlets focused on product sales. "Samsung Service Centers" are facilities dedicated to after-sales support, including device repairs, warranty services, and parts replacement. These formats are generally separate from Experience Stores and focus on narrower functions.

== Locations ==
Countries with a Samsung retail presence

Samsung Experience Stores are present in over 60 countries across 6 continents.

=== Bulgaria ===
The first Samsung Store in Bulgaria opened in February 2021 in Sofia, the country's capital, located within The Mall. Having initially used the Samsung Experience Store branding, the chain now uses the shorter Samsung Store name. As of 2025, there are six stores, four located in Sofia and two located in Plovdiv, with some locations offering television sets and home appliances by Samsung as well.

=== Canada ===
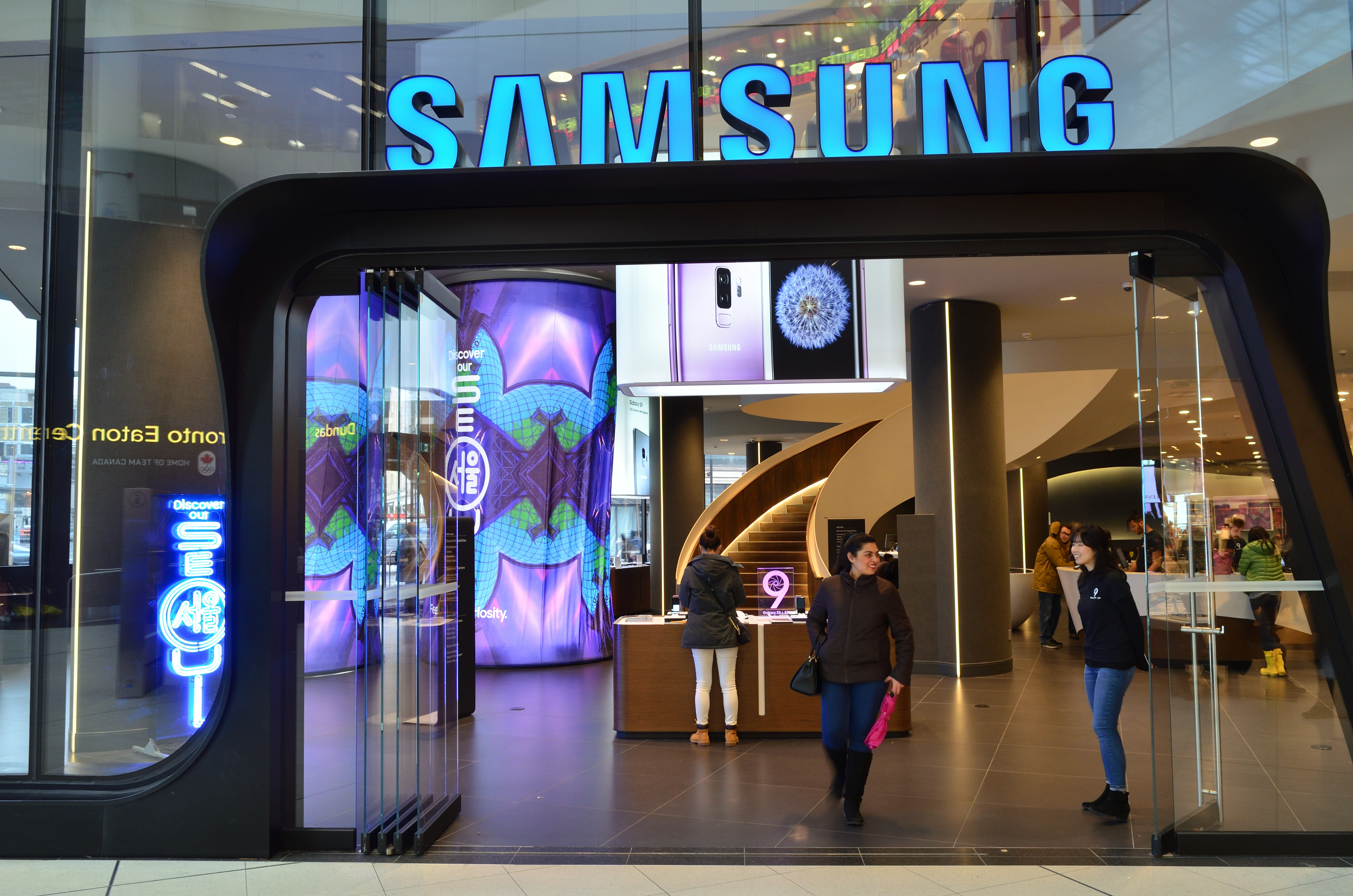
Samsung Experience Store at Toronto Eaton Centre

Samsung has seven Samsung Experience Stores in Canada, four of which are in Toronto.

The flagship store is located within the Toronto Eaton Centre and has two levels spanning 21,000 square feet. Unlike other locations which only sell mobile devices, it features the entire Samsung product portfolio. The flagship store at Toronto Eaton Centre closed permanently in fall 2023.

The other three Toronto locations are located in Scarborough Town Centre, Sherway Gardens, and Yorkdale Shopping Centre. Samsung's three other Samsung Experience Stores in Canada outside of Toronto are located in Edmonton's West Edmonton Mall, Vancouver's Metropolis at Metrotown, and Montreal's Montreal Eaton Center.

=== India ===
Samsung opened its second largest store and all products experience center in the world in Bangalore, Karnataka covering an area of 33,000 sq ft, under the name Samsung Opera House. The company additionally runs multiple other Samsung Experience Stores throughout the country, mostly under the Samsung SmartCafé sub-brand.

=== United States ===
Samsung opened its flagship store in the company's New York headquarters in the Meatpacking District on February 22, 2016. Dubbed Samsung 837 after its street address, 837 Washington Street, this store does not sell any Samsung products. Instead it's envisioned as a “marketing center” according to Gregory Lee, President and CEO of Samsung Electronics America, designed to showcase Samsung's future concepts and technologies to the public. Samsung 837 closed on December 24, 2024.

The first Samsung-run U.S. retail locations opened on February 20, 2019 in Garden City, N.Y., Houston and Los Angeles as part of the company's celebration of the Galaxy product line's ten year anniversary.
As of June 2024, Samsung has four Samsung Experience Stores in the United States. They are located in Houston's The Galleria, Los Angeles' Americana at Brand, Garden City's Roosevelt Field, and Dallas' Stonebriar Centre.

The location at Stanford Shopping Center in Palo Alto was permanently closed on May 19, 2024.

== Experience ==
=== History ===
Samsung has operated branded retail outlets in various formats since the early 2000s, but the concept of the Samsung Experience Store was formalized in the mid-2010s to create spaces centered on product demonstration rather than conventional retail. Early examples include Samsung 837 in New York City (opened in 2016) and Samsung Harajuku in Tokyo (2019), both of which operated as large-scale venues combining device displays with cultural and promotional programming. The chain was further formalized with the launch of Samsung Gangnam in Seoul in 2023, designated as the first official flagship under the Experience Store branding.

=== Expansion ===
Following the introduction of flagship sites, Samsung Experience Stores expanded into multiple regions through both directly operated outlets and others by authorized partners or subsidiaries. Large-format stores were established in metropolitan centers such as London, Dubai, Bangkok, and Bengaluru, while smaller stores were rolled out in shopping malls and commercial districts. The network has grown to encompass a mix of major flagship destinations and standardized retail spaces that offer standardized service features.

=== Experience & Service ===
The Experience Stores are structured to present Samsung’s consumer product lines in a context intended for demonstration and customer interaction. Typical locations include designated areas for smartphones, tablets, wearables, personal computers, and accessories, as well as smart home and connected device zones linked with the SmartThings platform. In addition to retail and technical support functions, some flagship locations include services and activities other than standard offerings. Examples include public event spaces used for cultural programming, live product demonstrations, and workshops for both consumers and developers. Certain stores also feature interactive installations and exhibition areas that present Samsung’s technology in relation to lifestyle or cultural themes, differentiating them from smaller retail-oriented outlets.

== See also ==
- Apple Store
- Google Store
- Microsoft Store
