= Samsung Galaxy Ecosystem =

Set of consumer electronics products

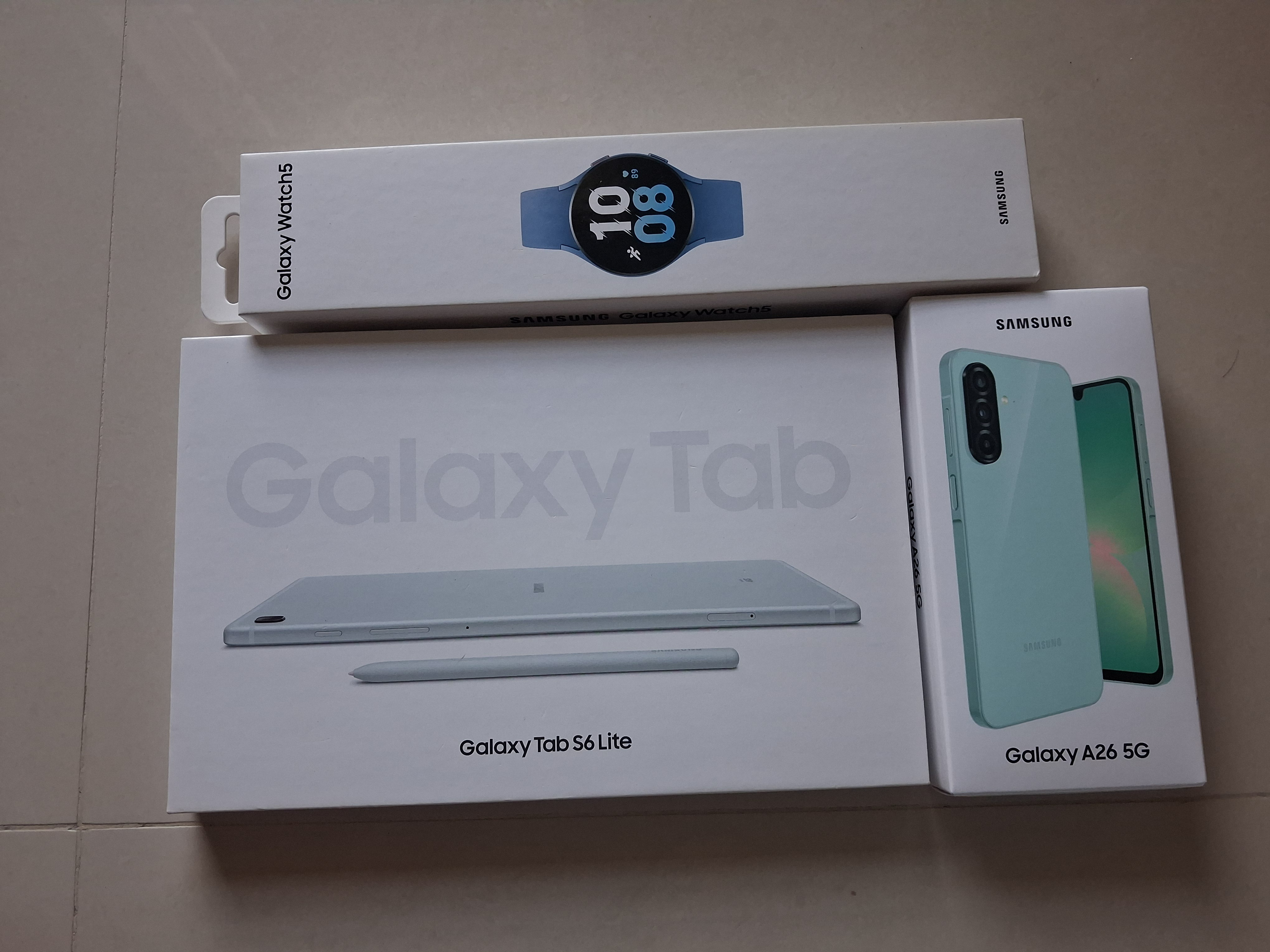
An example of Samsung Ecosystem. Top: Galaxy Watch 5 (44mm). Bottom left: Galaxy Tab S6 Lite (2024). Bottom right: Galaxy A26 5G.

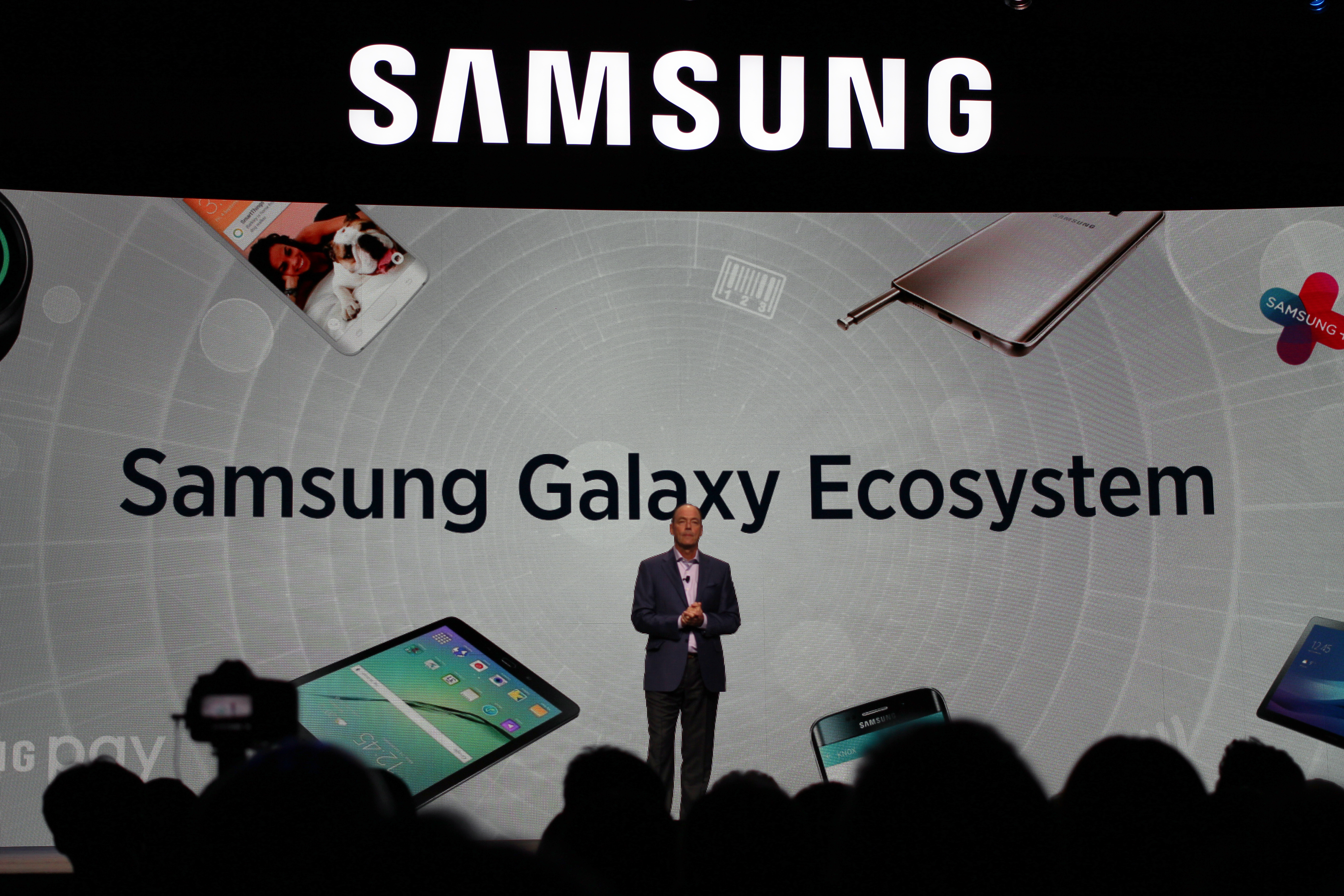
Galaxy Ecosystem CES 2016 Press Conference

The Galaxy Ecosystem refers to a set of consumer electronics products and cross-device software features developed by Samsung Electronics under the Samsung Galaxy brand. The ecosystem is designed to enable interoperability between Galaxy smartphones, tablets, laptops, and wearable devices, and to extend device connectivity to smart home and Internet of things (IoT) products through SmartThings.

Because many Galaxy devices are based on Android, and PC integration frequently involves Microsoft Windows, parts of the ecosystem rely on external operating system platforms and third-party services.

== Components ==
=== Hardware ===
The Galaxy Ecosystem consists of Samsung smartphones, tablets, laptops and wearables, and extends to smart home products through SmartThings.

- Smartphones: Galaxy smartphones serve as the primary devices for communication and app usage, supporting cross-device features such as proximity-based file sharing and external-display desktop modes.
  - Galaxy S series
  - Galaxy Z series
  - Galaxy A series
- Tablets: Galaxy tablets support the same connected environment, allowing content and documents to be accessed on a larger screen.
  - Galaxy Tab series
- Laptops: Galaxy Book laptops integrate with Galaxy phones and tablets through continuity tools that enable notifications, messaging, and file sharing across devices.
  - Galaxy Book series
- Wearables: Galaxy wearables provide functions such as health-related tracking, notification support, and audio integration with Galaxy smartphones.
  - Galaxy Watch
  - Galaxy Buds
  - Galaxy Ring
- Smart home and IoT: Through SmartThings, the Galaxy Ecosystem also includes televisions, appliances, and third-party smart devices that can be monitored or controlled from Galaxy mobile devices.
  - SmartThings-compatible televisions, home appliances, and connected devices

=== Software and services ===
A range of Samsung and partner services work together with the Galaxy Ecosystem to provide additional functionality:

- SmartThings: a platform for connecting and controlling smart home and IoT devices, including automation routines.
- Bixby: Samsung's virtual assistant and voice interface, available on supported Galaxy devices and certain home electronics.
- Quick Share: a proximity-based file sharing feature used for transferring content between nearby devices, including Android devices.
- Samsung DeX: a software feature that enables supported Galaxy smartphones and tablets to provide a desktop mode when connected to external displays.
- Phone Link / Link to Windows: Windows connectivity feature enabling Android devices to connect with Windows PCs for messaging, notifications, and media features.

== History ==
=== Acquisition of SmartThings (2014) ===
In August 2014, Samsung Electronics reached a deal to acquire SmartThings, a U.S. based startup known for its smart home platform and its crowdfunding-backed home automation hub. The acquisition was announced as part of Samsung's efforts to expand its presence in the emerging connected home market.

SmartThings

At the time of the deal, SmartThings had raised venture funding and gained attention for developing a system that allowed users to connect and manage household devices through a central platform.

The acquisition was widely reported as a significant step in Samsung's growing interest in Internet of Things (IoT) technologies, with SmartThings frequently referenced in later discussions of Samsung's ecosystem and connected-device strategy.

Quick Share

=== Integration of Quick Share and Nearby Share (2024) ===
At CES 2024, Google announced that its proximity based file sharing feature Nearby Share would be merged with Samsung's Quick Share and rebranded under a single name, Quick Share. The change was presented as a joint effort between Google and Samsung to streamline sharing across Android devices and reduce fragmentation between similar services.

Following the announcement, Quick Share became the unified branding for Android's built-in peer-to-peer sharing functionality, replacing Nearby Share on supported devices. The feature allows users to send files, links and other content between nearby phones, tablets and computers using a combination of wireless technologies such as Bluetooth and Wi-Fi.

After the transition, the Quick Share name was increasingly adopted across the broader Android ecosystem, rather than remaining limited to Samsung's Galaxy devices, reflecting Google's move to standardize the experience across manufacturers.

=== Integration and Unification of PC Connectivity Solutions (late 2024) ===
Samsung DeX

In late 2024, Samsung discontinued support for the DeX app for Windows, which had allowed certain Galaxy devices to provide a desktop-like interface when connected to a PC. Samsung directed users toward Microsoft's Phone Link (also branded as "Link to Windows") as an alternative method for connecting Galaxy smartphones with Windows computers.

Phone Link provides features such as notification syncing, messaging access, and the ability to interact with mobile content from a Windows desktop. DeX functionality remained available through other supported methods, such as connecting devices directly to external displays.

=== SmartThings Update (2025) ===
In July 2025, Samsung released an update to SmartThings that introduced natural-language routine creation through a feature referred to as the Routine Creation Assistant. The update allows users to create automation routines by describing desired actions in conversational language rather than configuring each step manually.

The feature was presented as part of Samsung's ongoing development of SmartThings automation tools, enabling routines to be generated more directly from user input.

== Limitations ==
=== Redundant connectivity apps and naming complexity ===
For PC integration, Phone Link (built into Windows), Link to Windows (for Android), and Samsung Flow (limited to Samsung devices) are used together. These applications offer partially overlapping functionality but differ in supported devices and usage conditions, requiring users to choose different apps depending on their device combination.

=== Limits of OS-level control ===
Cross-device features in the Galaxy Ecosystem rely in part on external platforms such as Android and Windows, which can make it difficult to maintain a uniform connectivity and user experience across all devices.

== See also ==
- SmartThings
- Bixby
- Quick Share
- Samsung DeX
- Phone Link
- Galaxy AI
- Samsung Knox
