= Lapdock =

Accessory which allows a mobile device to have a laptop user interface

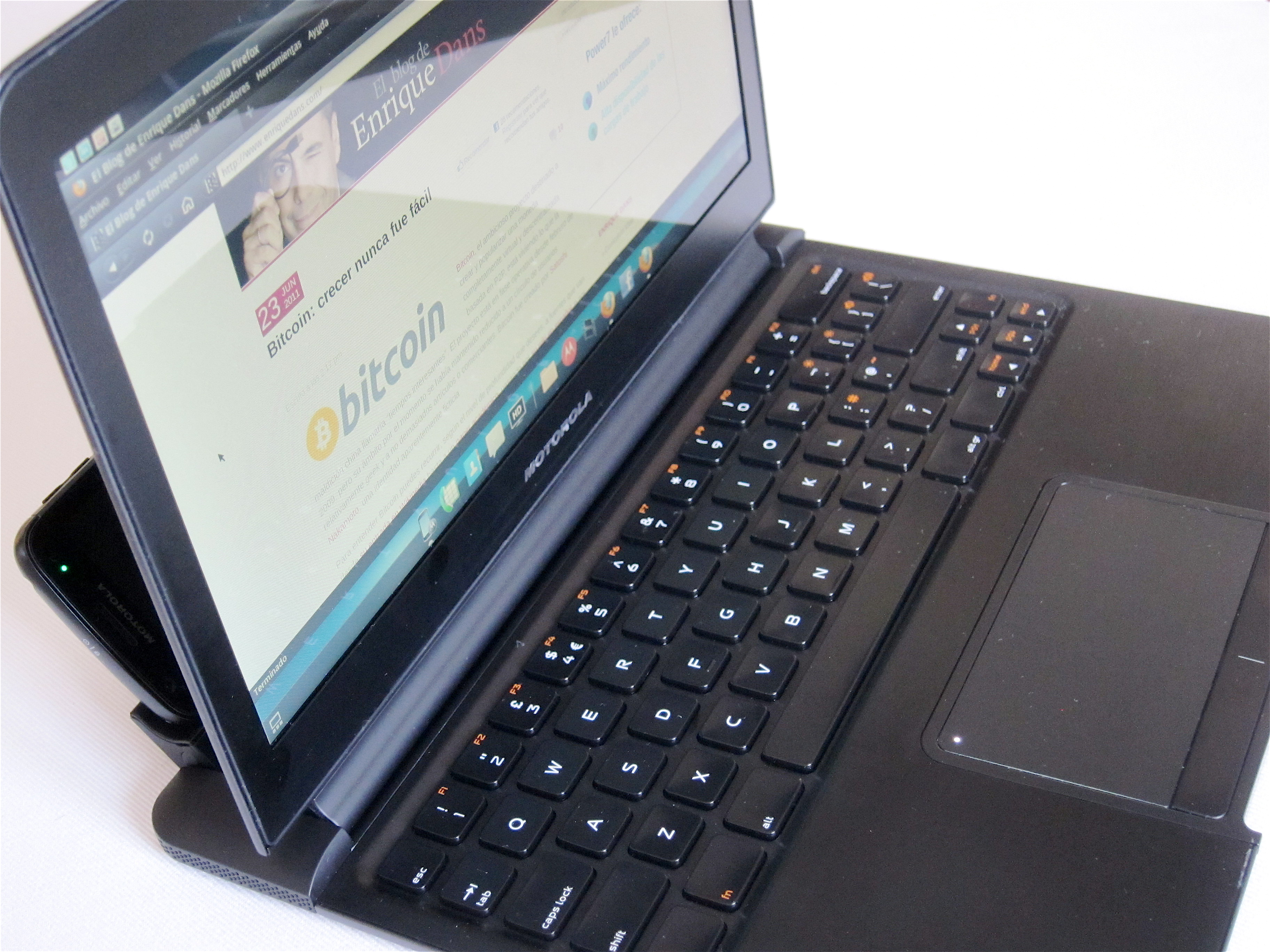
A Motorola Atrix 4G hooked up to its lapdock.

A lapdock is a lightweight and portable docking station that can be connected to a mobile phone or tablet so it can be used similarly to a laptop computer. All computation happens in the smartphone or tablet, while the lapdock provides a bigger screen, a keyboard and a battery. The name lapdock is a portmanteau of laptop and dock.

== History ==
In the 2000s several "smartphone companions" were launched that are similar to the accessories later called lapdocks. Two include the Palm Foleo (2007) and Celio's REDFLY Mobile Companion (2008), a dumb-terminal device with an 8-inch, 800×480-pixel display and full keyboard that connected to Windows Mobile smartphones via USB or Bluetooth. Both received negative reviews and went off the market quite rapidly.

In 2011 the Motorola Lapdock was released for pairing with Motorola Atrix 4G phone, allowing users to run a desktop-like environment where the phone was "the brains" and the lapdock a "dumb laptop".

In 2017, French company Miraxess launched the MiraBook, which connected to smartphones using a USB-C cable, and used desktop-like interfaces for mobile phones like Samsung DeX and Windows Continuum.
