= Brigade Road =

Road and shopping hub in central Bengaluru

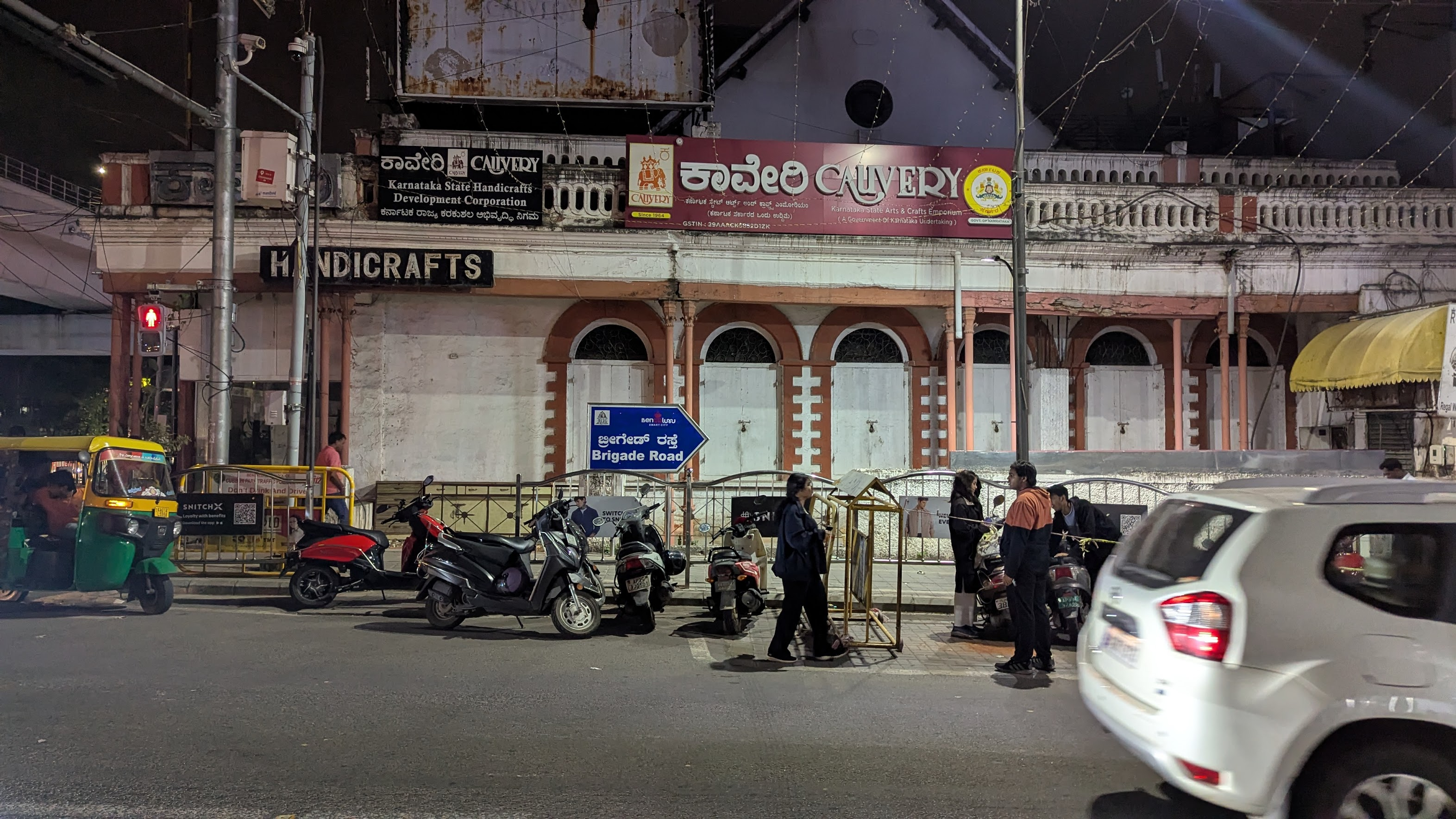

Major junctions
- North end: M G Road
- South end: Hosur Road

Location
- Country: India
- State: Karnataka
- Major cities: Bengaluru

Highway system
- Roads in India; Expressways; National; State; Asian; State Highways in Karnataka

Brigade Road is a large commercial centre and one of the busiest shopping areas in the heart of Bengaluru, the capital of Karnataka State, India. It is a one-way connecting road from M G Road to Hosur Road, also connecting Residency Road and Church Street on the way.

== Description ==
Notable buildings on this road include St. Patrick's Church and the Bengaluru Opera House. The Opera House is currently on lease to Samsung and is called the Samsung Opera House. The multinational uses it as an Experience Centre and store. Another notable landmark is the Sapper War Memorial, a First World War memorial dedicated to the fallen soldiers of the Madras Sappers & Miners (Madras Engineer Group).

The road is most famous as a commercial centre. It has several shopping centres, bookstores and retail outlets of international brands. It has many cafes, restaurants, pubs and other such happening places. The road has been a New Year celebration hub in the city for many years and the entire length of the street is usually adorned with fairy lights stretching across its width for the celebrations. The first KFC outlet in India opened on Brigade Road in June 1995.

In 2004, parking meters were imported from France to manage the 85 parking slots on the road. On an average, 1400 cars, park in a day.

== Connectivity ==
Brigade Road has a bus station. It can also be accessed from the M G Road metro station on the Purple Line of Namma Metro.

== Gallery ==
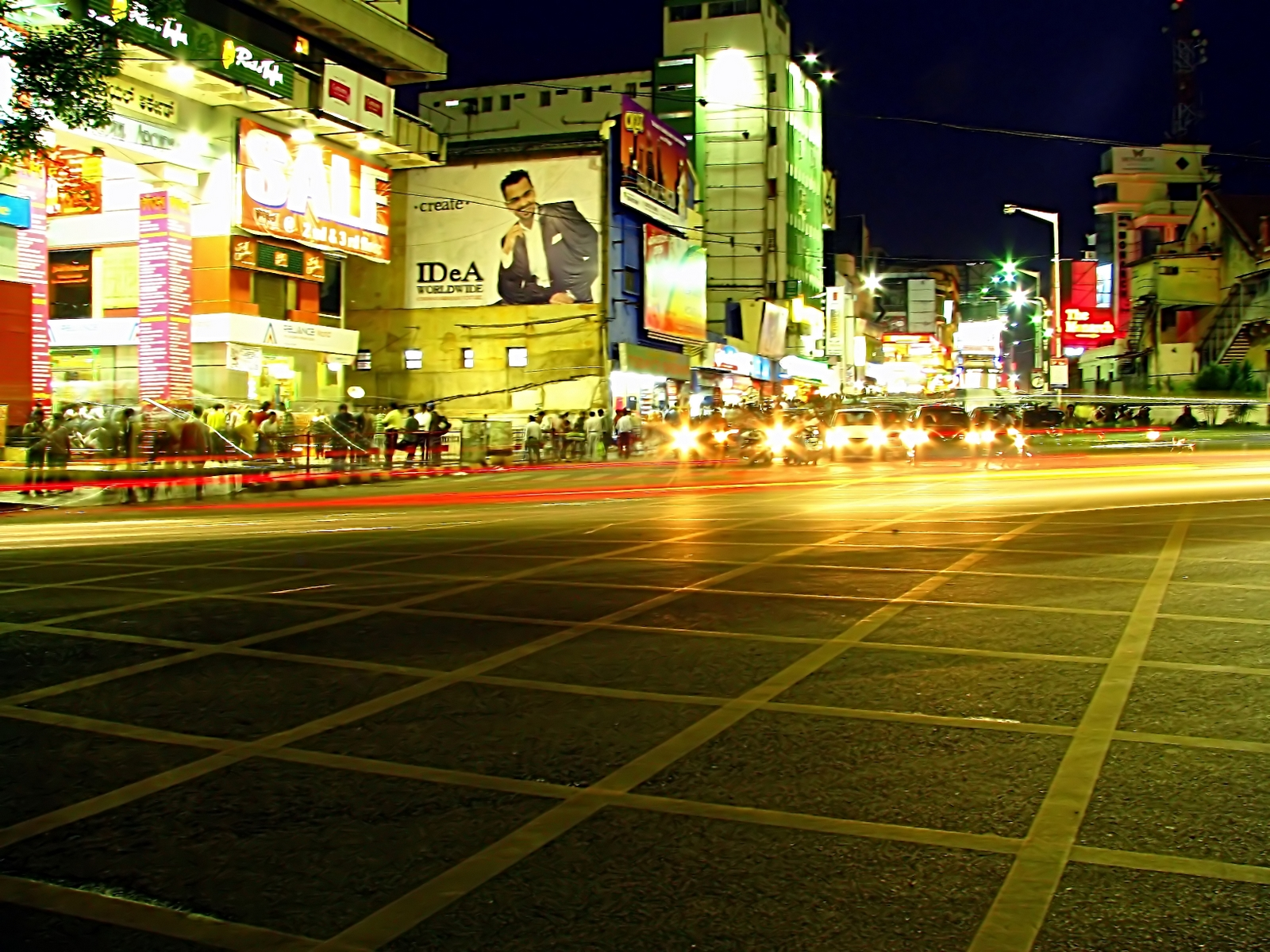
Brigade Road, Bengaluru, in the evening

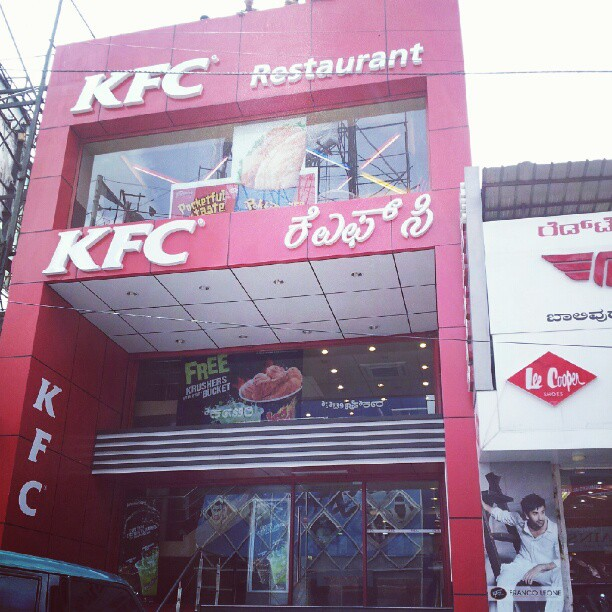
KFC restaurant on Brigade Road

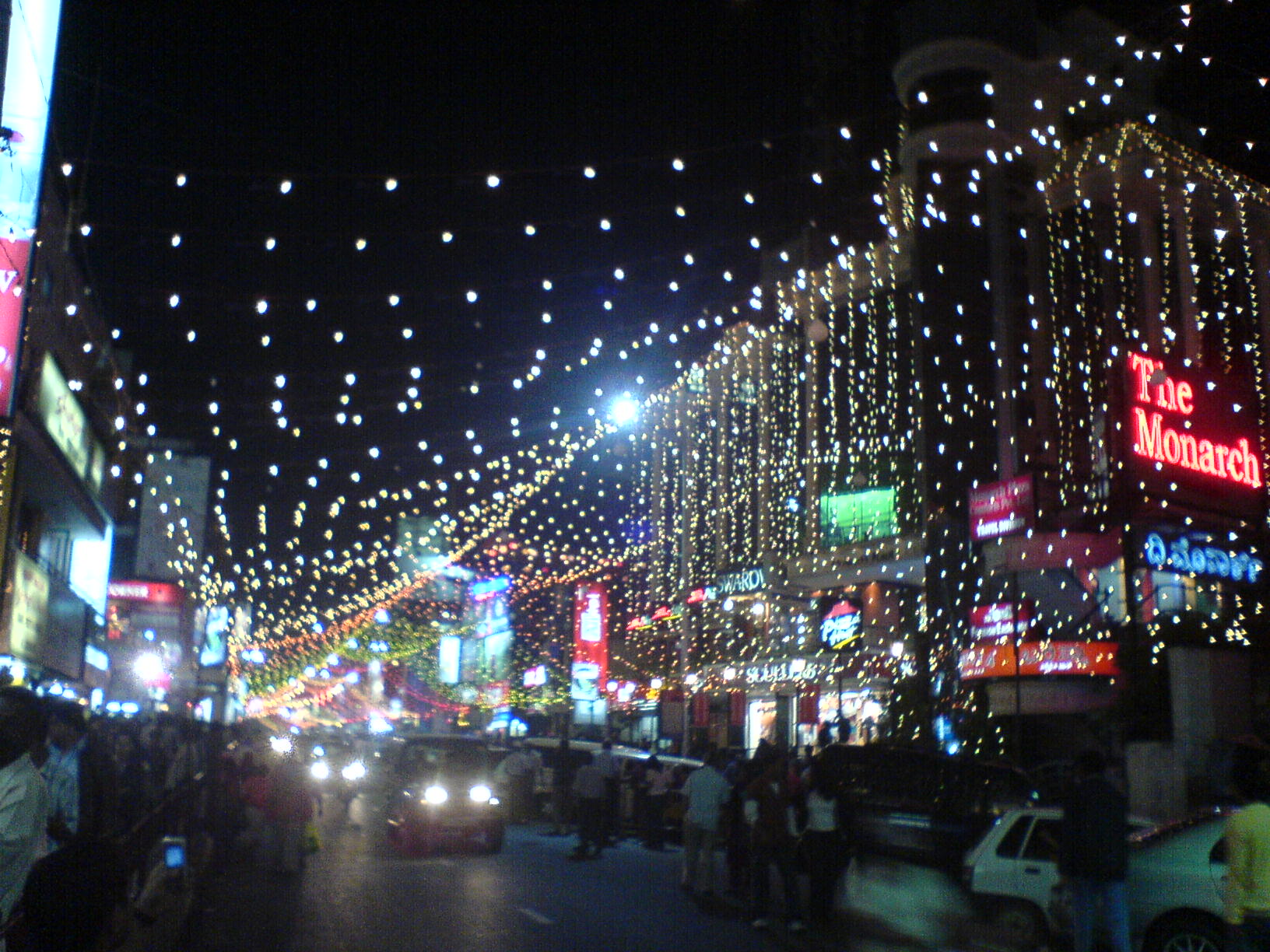
Fairy lights installed for New Year celebrations

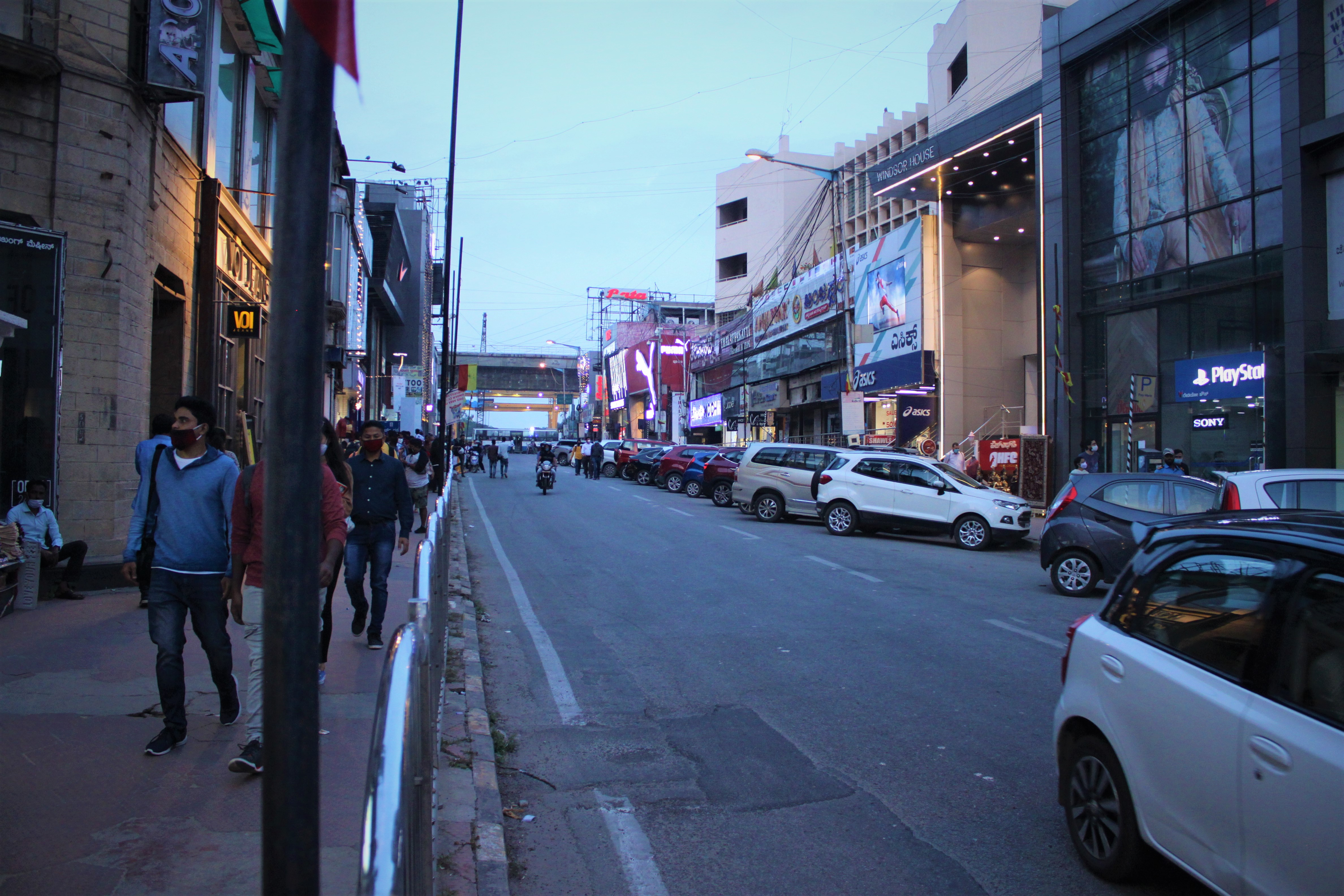
A view of the northern part of Brigade Road, facing its M. G. Road entrance

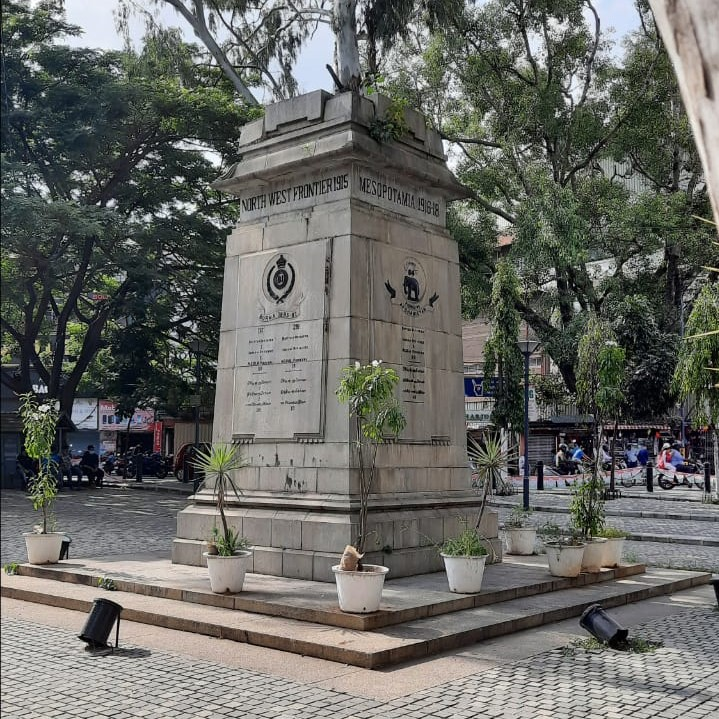
The Sapper War Memorial

== See also ==
- List of tourist attractions in Bengaluru
- M G Road, Bengaluru
