= Aeotec =

Aeotec Group GmbH
- Trade name: Aotec
- Formerly: Aeon Labs LLC (2008–2011); Aeotec, Inc. (2011–2019); Aeotec Group GmbH. (2019-Present)
- Type: Private
- Industry: Electronics, Home automation
- Founded: 2006; 20 years ago in Silicon Valley, California
- Founder: Winston Zin
- Headquarters: Hamburg, Germany
- Area served: Worldwide
- Key people: Winston Zin (Chairman)
- Brands: Aeotec; Popp & Co.
- Number of employees: 50 (2020)
- Subsidiaries: A.I.Pilot GmbH; Aeotec Limited; Aeotec Technology (Shenzhen) Ltd., Co.; IOT Holding GmbH; Z-Wave Europe GmbH
- Website: www.aeotec.com

Aeotec is a German home automation and electronics company based in Hamburg with operations in a number of countries and sales worldwide. It used to be known as Aeon Labs and was headquartered in Silicon Valley, California.

Its range of products utilizes the Zigbee and Z-Wave communications protocol, the latter being a technology to which Aeotec owns the European rights.

Aeotec has partnerships with multiple providers including Alarm.com, ADT, AT&T, Huawei, for whom Aeotec is a core connected home accessory provider, Orange S.A., and Telefónica.

== History ==
The company was founded in 2008 as Aeon Labs in Silicon Valley. Between 2008 and 2011 it developed the Z-wave wireless controllers and sensors. It initially built smart‑home accessories for various clients as an original equipment manufacturer (OEM). It later introduced its own brand products with the majority of the company's products released under the company's own brand name of Aeotec.

Around 2011, the company rebranded from Aeon Labs LLC to Aeotec, Inc., and then in 2019 transitioned to Aeotec Group GmbH. The group acquired German electronics maker Popp & Co., founded in 1930, and also Z-Wave Europe, a major distributor of Internet of things (IoT) and Smart Home products. The acquisitions moved both its headquarters and research-and-development operations to Germany.

== Products ==
Aeotec products have been designed to work with controllers such as Matter, Home Assistant, openHab, SmartThings, and Wink along with the group's own controllers AutoPilot and Smart Home Hub.

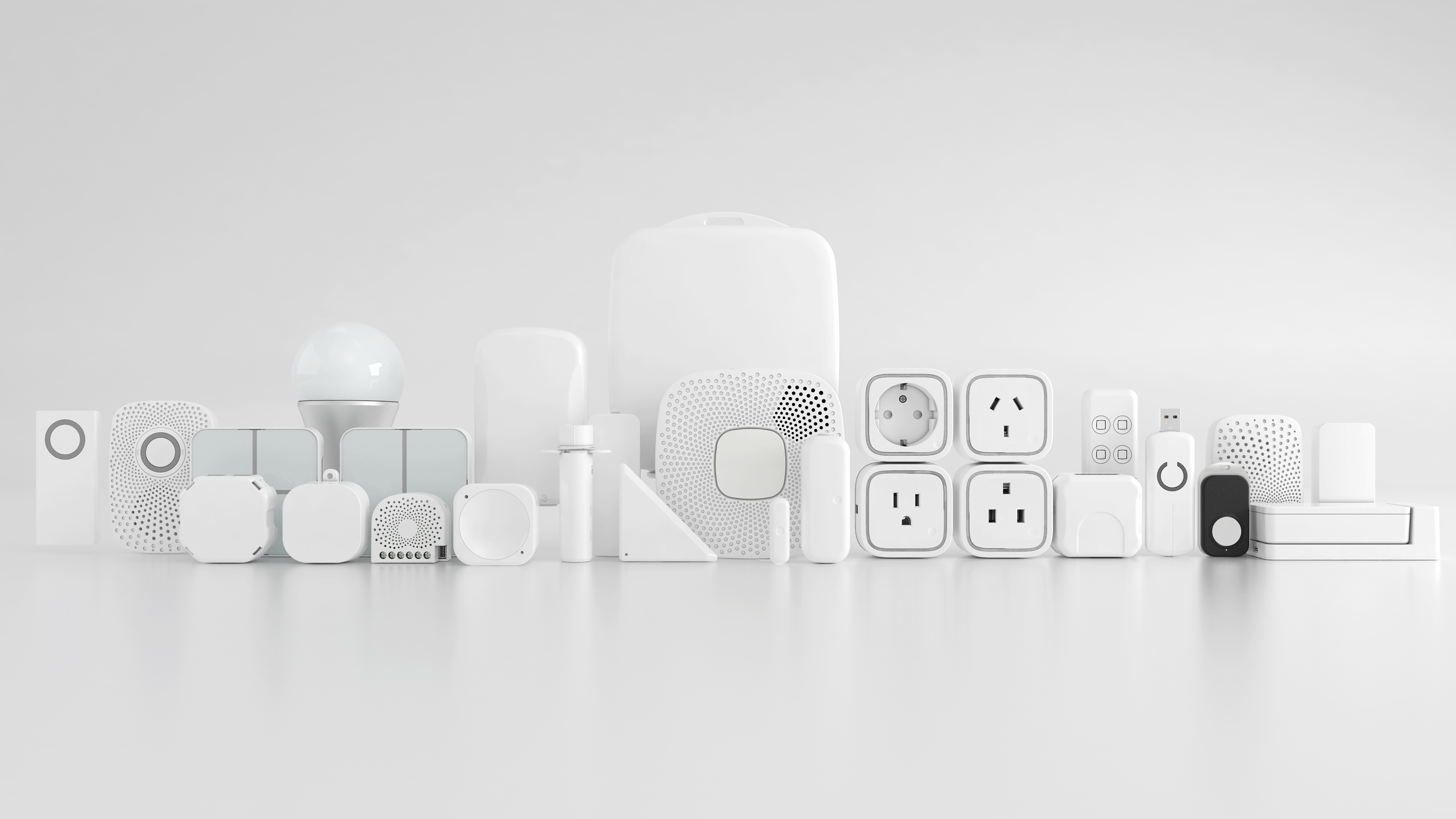
Products made by Aeotec.
