= Samsung DeX =

Desktop-like feature of Samsung mobile devices

Logo

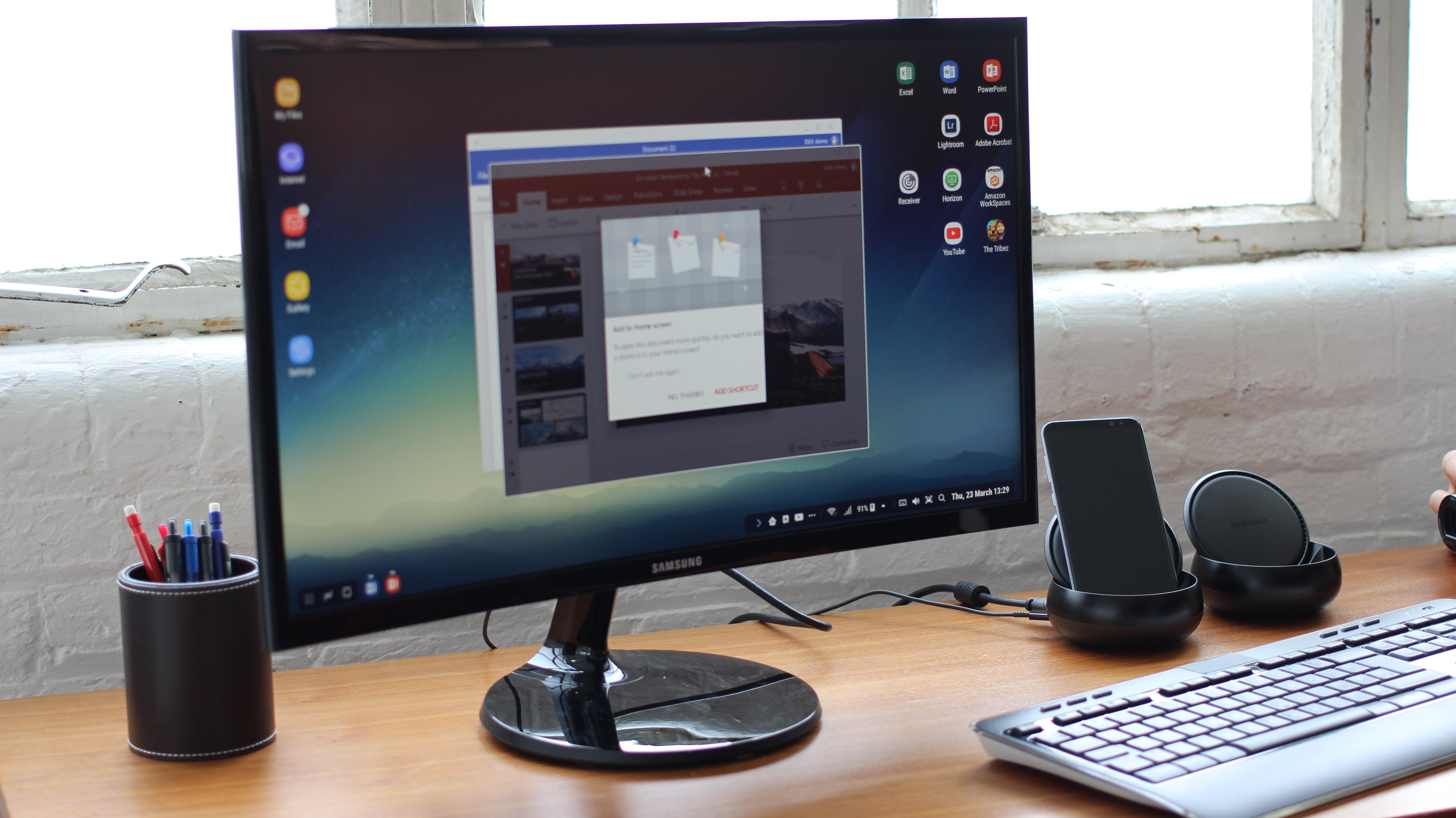
A Samsung Galaxy S8 plugged into the DeX docking station. The monitor is displaying the Android applications PowerPoint and Word.

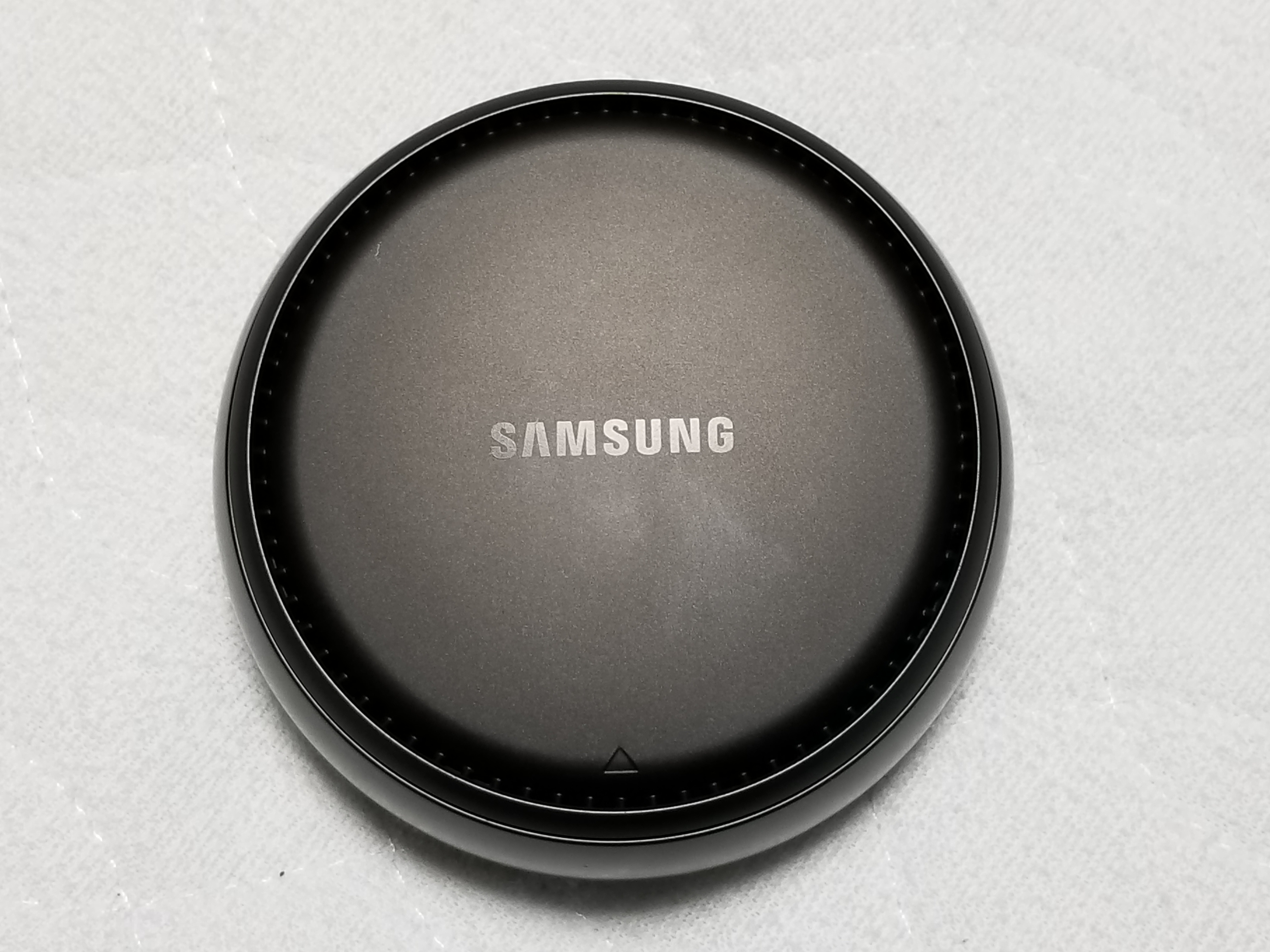
DeX Station

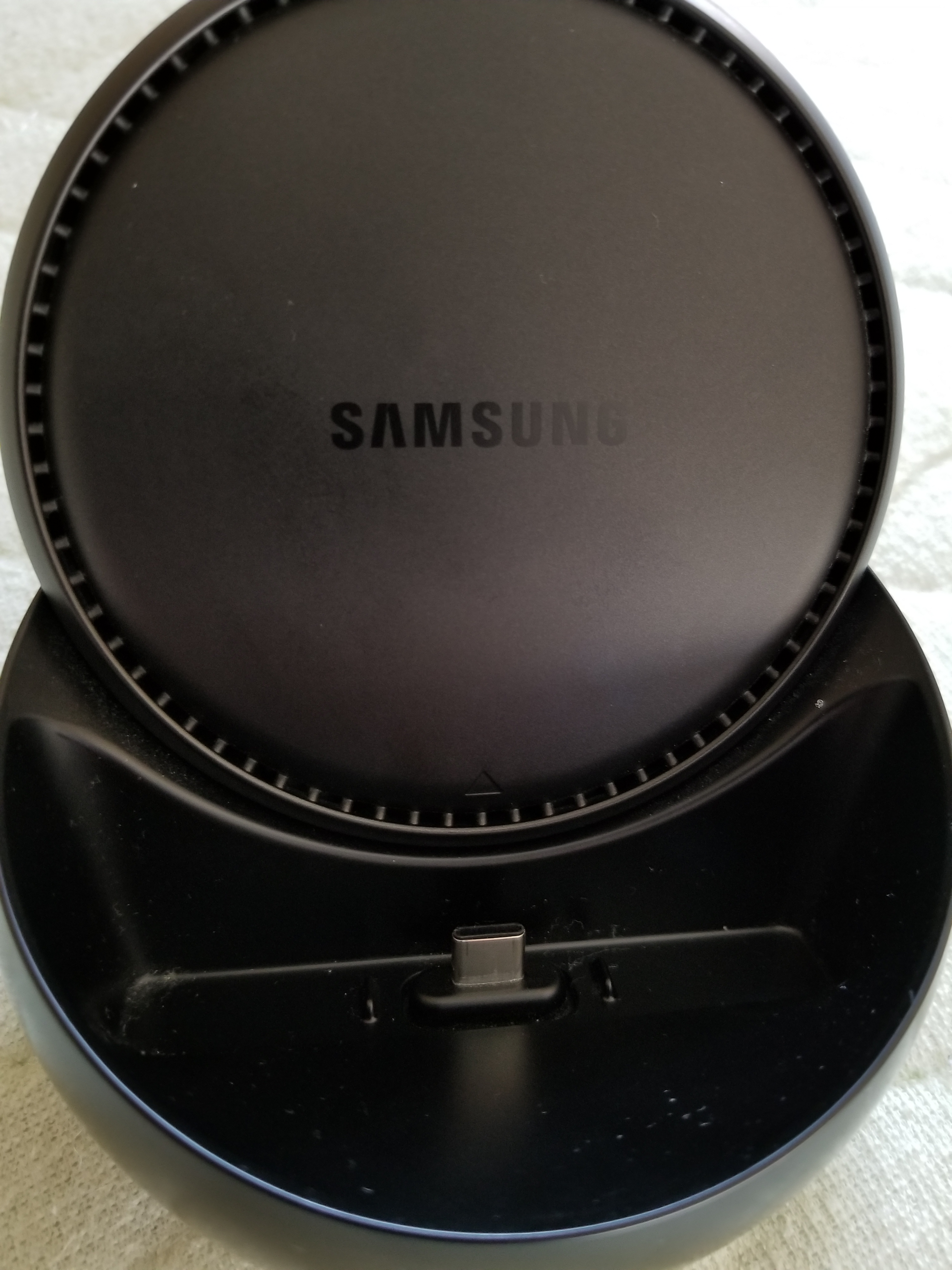
DeX Station when opened, showing the USB-C docking

Samsung DeX (stylized as SΛMSUNG DeX) is a feature included on some high-end Samsung handheld devices that enables users to extend their device into a desktop-like experience by connecting a keyboard, mouse, and monitor. The name "DeX" is a contraction of "Desktop eXperience".

For technical specifications, Samsung DeX requires hardware such as USB 3.1 transfer specification, USB-C port with DisplayPort Alternate Mode support to be present on a mobile device. Samsung first included the DeX feature on the Galaxy S8, and has continued to support the feature on most of their high-end smartphones, including the Galaxy S, Note, Z Fold, and Z Flip lines. The feature is also available on many Galaxy Tab S models, from Galaxy Tab S4 onwards. DeX is also available on the Galaxy A series, with the Galaxy A90 5G being the only smartphone from the series to support it.

== History ==
In 2017, the original version of DeX was released, which required the use of a proprietary docking accessory called the DeX Station. This provided a USB-C port, Ethernet, HDMI 2.0 output and two USB 2.0 ports.

In August 2018, with the launch of the Note 9, Samsung introduced the DeX HDMI adapter (USB-C to female HDMI), DeX cable (USB-C to male HDMI) and DeX multiport adapter, which whilst still proprietary and containing active electronics, eliminated the need for the previous docking accessories. Also in 2018, Samsung released the DeX PAD. This provided a USB-C port, HDMI, and two USB ports. Both design configurations enable the cell phone to lie flat and function as a touchpad or even continue being used as a phone in its usual fashion whilst being connected to a display and with DeX operating.

Since 2019, with the Galaxy Note 10 and Galaxy Fold, DeX can now be launched via a direct cable connection to a physical computer using the existing provided charging cable or any similar off-the-shelf USB-C cable with data transfer, eliminating the need for any proprietary docking accessories.

DeX has also been used in the public safety setting to replace in-vehicle laptops.

Samsung also announced "Linux on Galaxy" (since renamed to "Linux on DeX") which allows the use of a compatible Linux distribution rather than the default Android OS giving full personal computer capabilities.

The DeX Desktop can also be accessed with a downloadable app for Windows and macOS or through third-party accessories. Users can connect to their mobile devices with a USB cable. As of April 2022, macOS and Windows 7 are no longer supported.

Samsung DeX devices can be managed by Samsung Knox (3.3 and higher) to allow or restrict access using the Knox platform for added control and security.

In October 2019 Samsung announced that Linux on DeX will not be available for Android 10 and warned users that after upgrading to Android 10 they will not be able to downgrade, permanently losing the ability to use full Linux applications.

In 2020, wireless Dex was introduced, enabling Note 9 and newer phones to use Miracast to project the desktop experience to a PC previously connected via USB or a wireless monitor/TV.

As of 2024, Samsung DeX's PC app is no longer supported on devices running One UI 7 and higher.

== See also ==
Other devices with a similar feature:

- Android's Desktop Mode, available on tablets with Android 16 or later.
- Webtop, a similar feature of the Motorola Atrix series from the early 2010s, which required specialized hardware.
- Ready For and Smart Connect, a feature of some high-end Motorola phones that includes a desktop mode as well as TV, Video Chat and Game modes.
- Easy Projection, a similar desktop mode found on the Huawei Mate 10, Mate 20 and Huawei Mate 30 phones
- Screen+, a similar desktop environment mode found on the LG Velvet and V60 phones.
- Continuum, a similar feature announced by Microsoft in 2015 for Windows 10 Mobile
- Ubuntu Edge

Other:

- Docking station
- Lapdock
