= Samsung Opera House =

Historic building in Bengaluru, India

Coordinates: 12°58′21″S 77°36′27″E

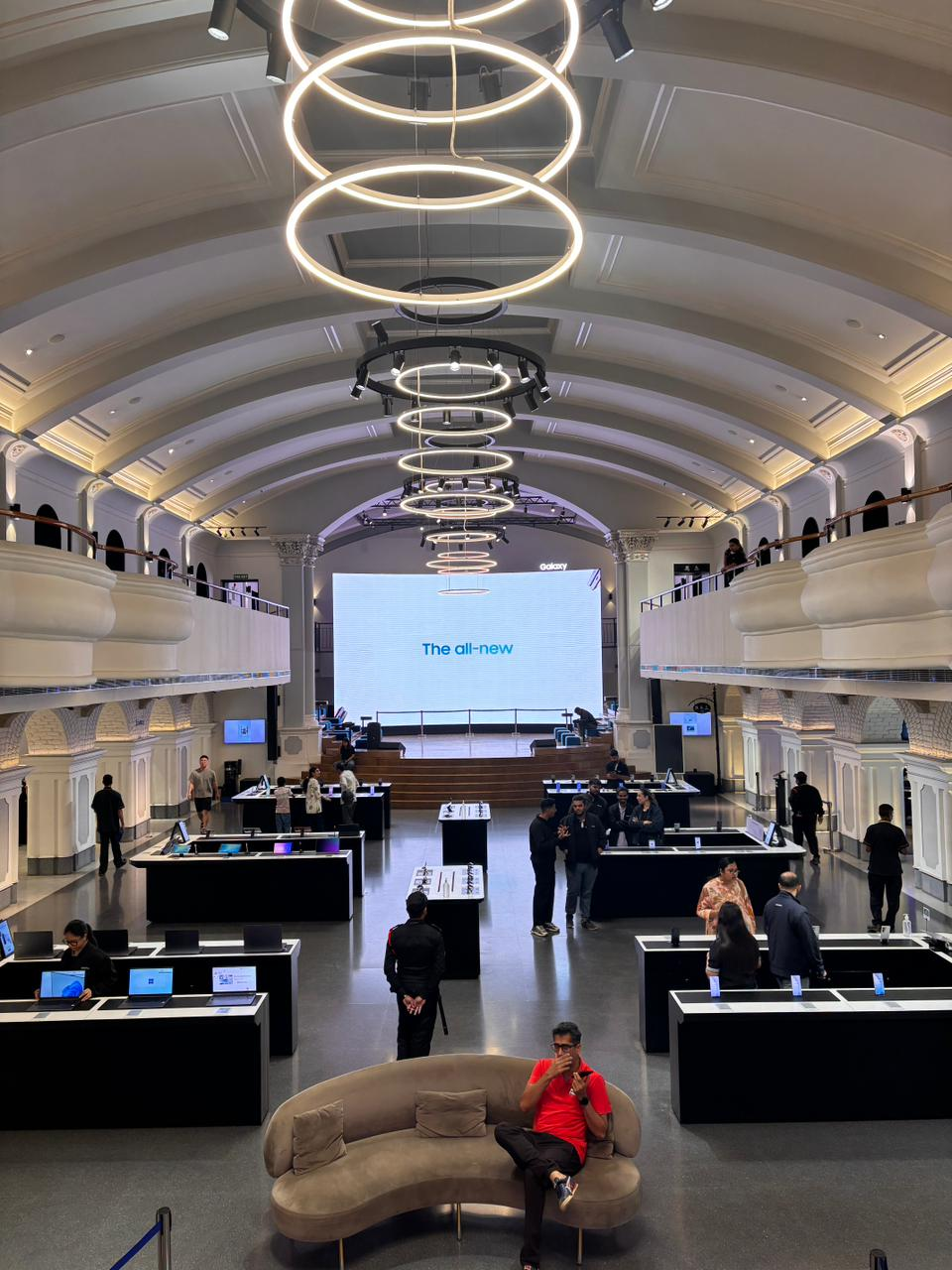
- Samsung Opera House in 2026

General information
- Location: Brigade Road, Bengaluru, India
- Year built: 1930s
- Opened: 2017 (as Samsung Opera House)
- Landlord: K R Kanakarathnam Family

Design and construction
- Architect: Thomas Charles William Skipp

Samsung Opera House is a heritage building and a chain of Samsung Electronics retail and experience centre located on Brigade Road in Bengaluru, India. It is considered as one of the world’s largest mobile experience centre currently.

== History ==
The building where it is located was constructed in the 1930s during the British colonial period and originally functioned as a venue for opera, theatre, dance, and musical performances, drawing audiences that included British soldiers and officers stationed in Bangalore. Occupying roughly 33,000 square feet on Brigade Road, at its junction with Residency Road. The building was designed by Thomas Charles William Skipp.

Over decades the venue's use shiften into a cinema hall, after it was later bought under lease by K R Kanakarathnam in 1959.

In 1979, when the lease expired, the lessors did not leave, causing them to file an eviction suit. The lititation went on for about 24 years, later in 2003, they won the case, leading to get back posssession. During the period, various illegal occupants including 53 shops selling clothing, small eats, and pirated softwares were operating in and outside the building, resulting in over 53 related cases being filed and contested.

By the 1980s, its popularity as an entertainment venue had declined, and the building fell into disrepair.

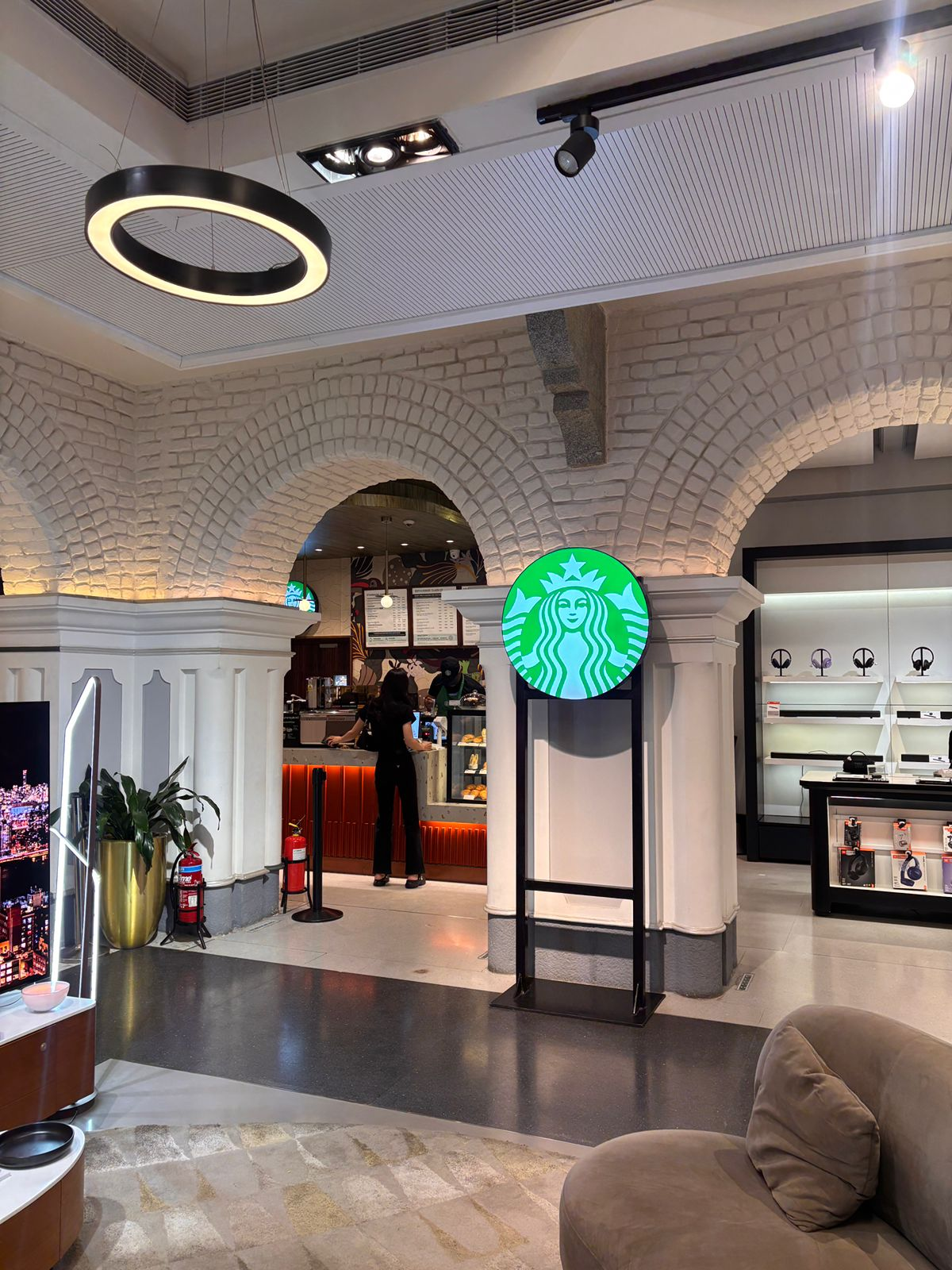
Tata Starbucks outlet in Samsung Opera House

Later, Samsung Electronics took over the site under a long-term lease from the family holding the property, Ramakrishnan family, reportedly for a period of ten years, with the condition that the building's original architecture and character, including its mud-tiled roof, be preserved. Around 2016, the restoration work began with the aim of retaining the historic structure while adapting the interior for use as a retail and technology showcase space.

In 2017, the renovated building reopened to the public as Samsung Opera House, which the company has described as its largest mobile and consumer-electronics experience centre. The venue showcases Samsung smartphones, home appliances, televisions, and audio products, alongside features built around virtual reality, artificial intelligence, and Technology demonstrations. It also includes a customer service centre, public Wi-Fi, a gaming and fitness zone.

It is also used by the company for product-related workshops, photography classes, and other promotional and community events in Bengaluru. It had also hosted public musical performances.

In 2023, a Starbucks outlet operated in partnership with Tata Starbucks.
