= Docking station =

Computer connection

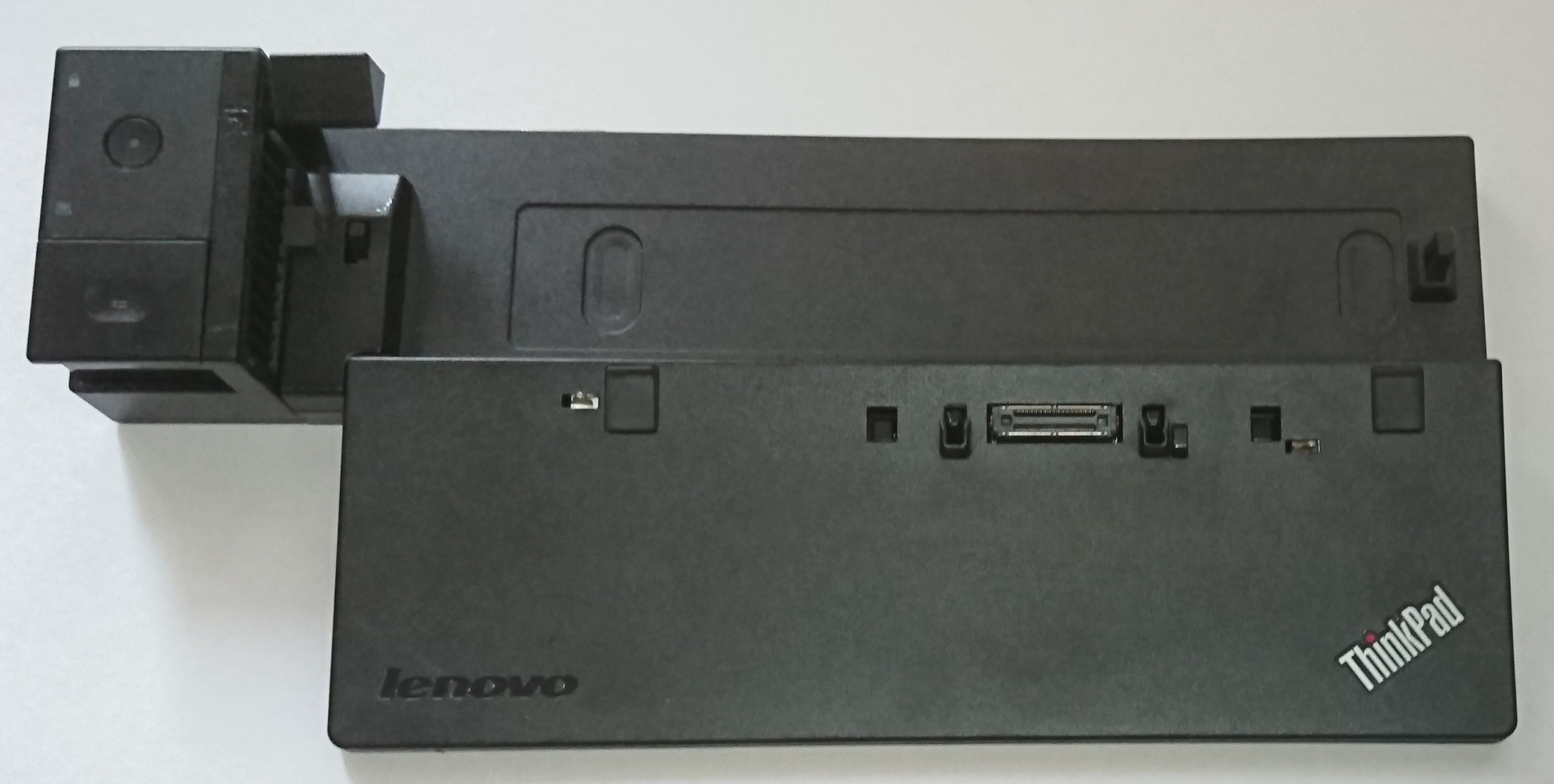
OEM Docking station

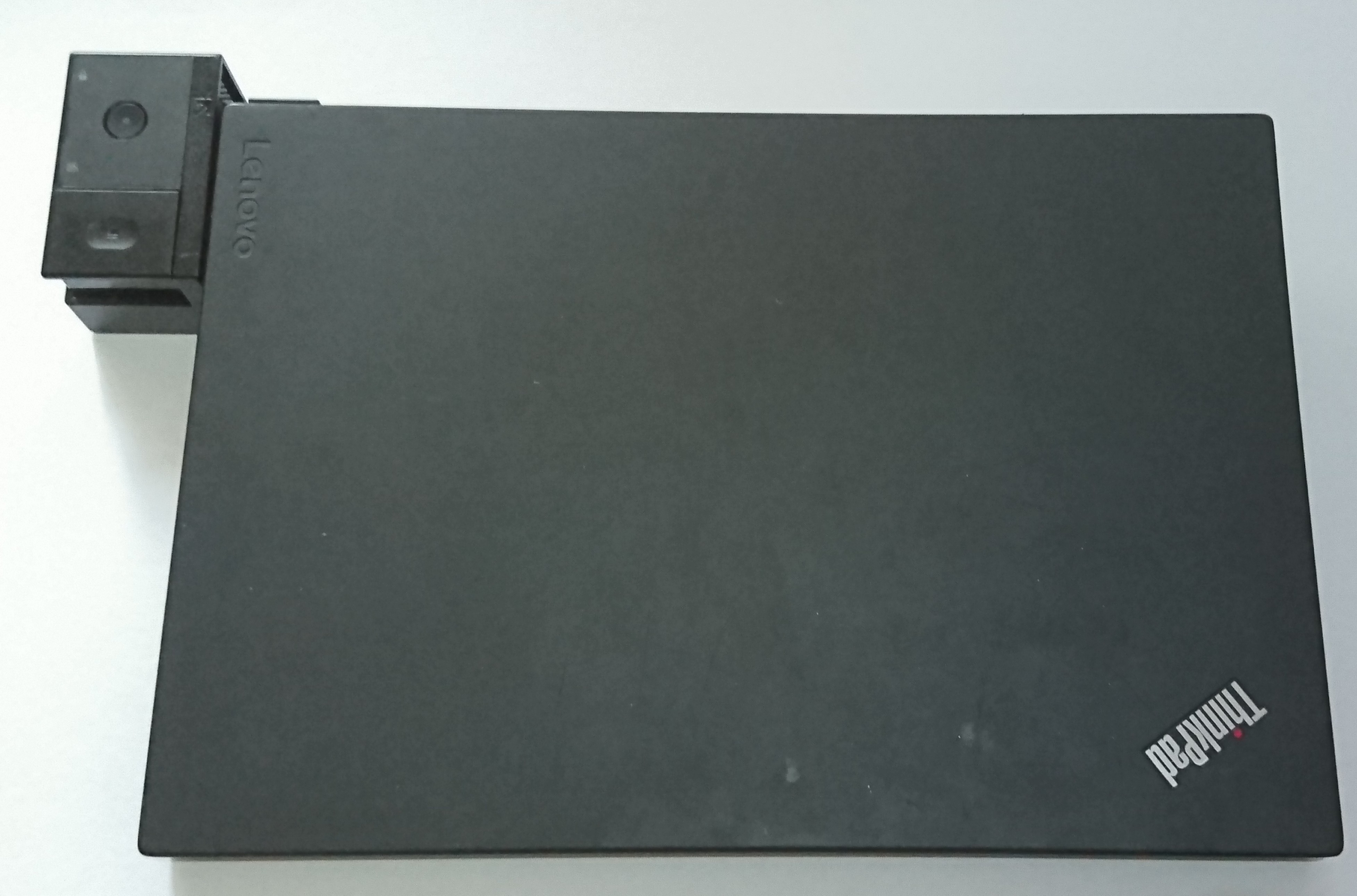
OEM Docking station and laptop

In computing, a docking station, port replicator (hub), or dock provides a simplified way to plug-in a mobile device, such as connect common peripherals to a laptop, or charge a smartphone. Because a wide range of dockable devices—from mobile phones to wireless mouse—have different connectors, power signaling, and uses, docks are unstandardized and are therefore often designed for a specific type of device.

A dock can allow some laptop computers to become a substitute for a desktop computer, without sacrificing the mobile computing functionality of the machine. Portable computers can dock and undock hot, cold or standby, depending on the abilities of the system. In a cold dock or undock, one completely shuts the computer down before docking/undocking. In a hot dock or undock, the computer remains running when docked/undocked. Standby docking or undocking, an intermediate style used in some designs, allows the computer to be docked/undocked while powered on, but requires that it be placed into a sleep mode prior to docking/undocking.

== Types ==
Docking stations can be broadly split up into five basic varieties.

=== Expansion dock ===
This type of dock provides some sort of hardware expansion for the device docked to it, such as an external storage drive, a GPU, or a liquid cooling radiator.

=== Port replicator/hub ===
Port replicators (sometimes referred to as passthroughs) are functionally and logically identical to a bundle of extension cables, except that they are plugged in and unplugged together through the device. Some also include electrical adaptors to change from one pinout to another (e.g., Micro-DVI to normal DVI connector.) Often Bus-Powered and small form factor, they functionally duplicate ports from the device to easily access more of the existing ports like: SD cards, peripherals, audio jacks, etc. as well as external display(s).

=== Breakout dock/multi-port adapter ===
A breakout dock is conceptually a breakout box in the form of a dock. It is an extension to a typical port replicator in that it not only replicates existing ports already on the computer, but also offers additional ports. Modern computers most often accomplish this by using a special, often proprietary, connector that consolidates the signals from many concealed traces from onboard external buses into one connector. As such, the dock can offer a greater number of ports than is physically present on the computer. This allows the basic unit to have fewer physical ports while still allowing users a way to access to the full range of features of its motherboard.

Most companies that produce laptops with such breakout ports also offer simpler adapters that grant access to one or two of the buses consolidated in them at a time.

=== OEM/proprietary dock ===
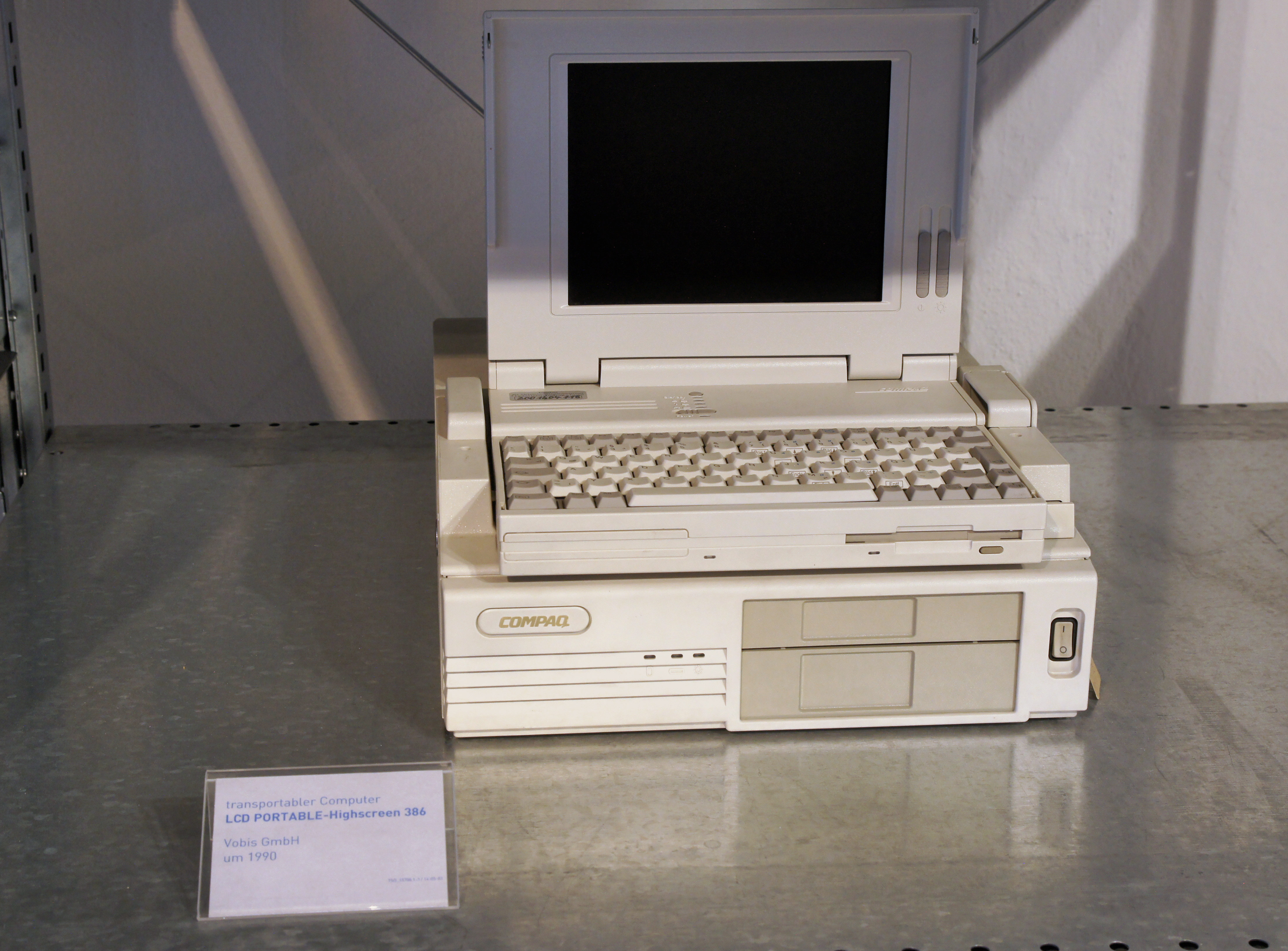
Compaq LTE Lite laptop with proprietary dock

Similar to a breakout device, some docking stations produce multiple connections from one port, only instead of extracting them from internal chipsets, they create them inside the dock using converters. They are functionally identical to a hub with various converters plugged in. Often using proprietary connections and usually meant to be permanently installed, these self-powered docks are intended for specific models of notebooks and would require upgrading at the same time as the notebook. Often, OEM docks contain a wired internet connection, dual displays, and a range of USB and Audio connections.

=== Universal or third-party dock ===
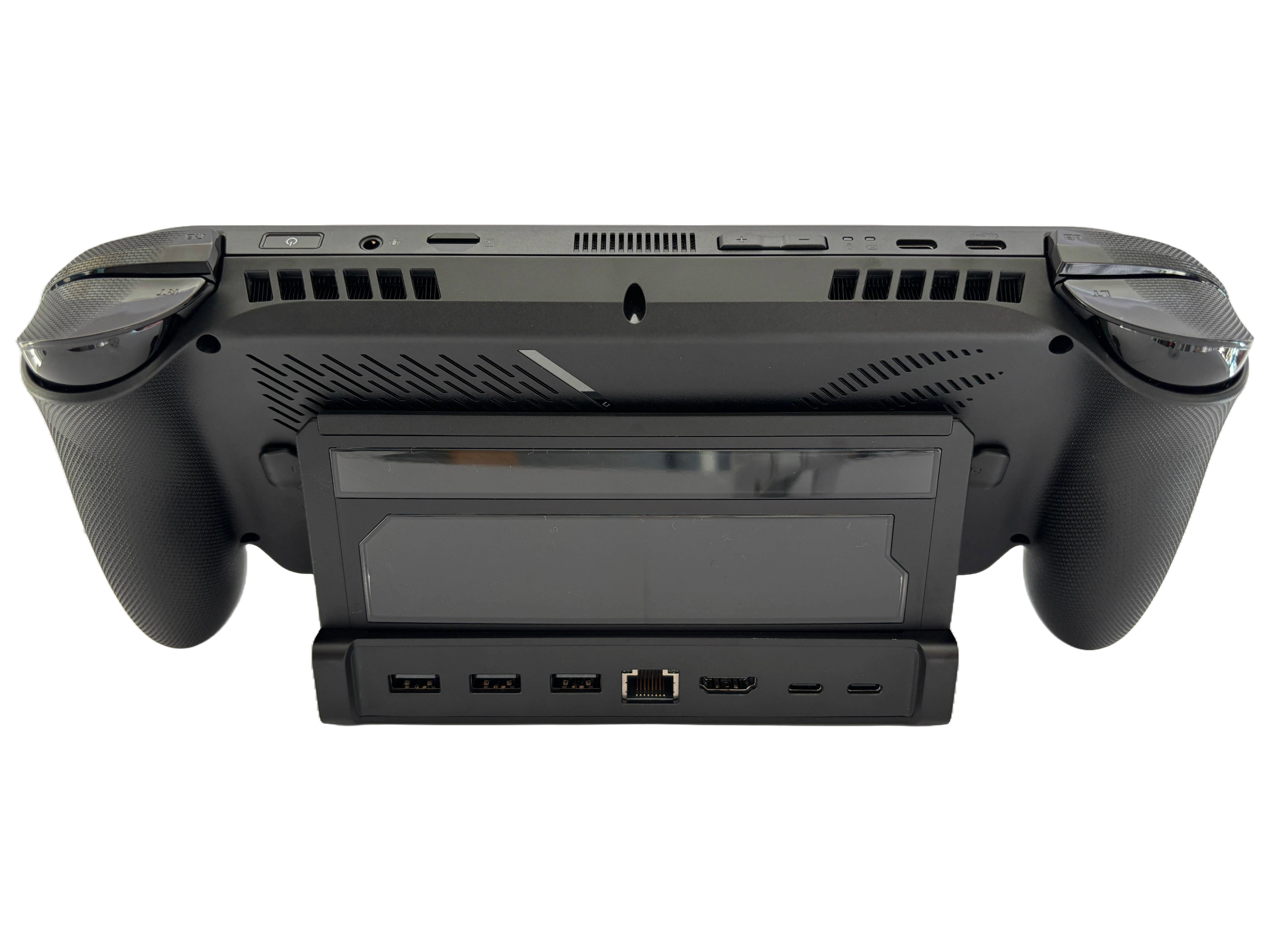
The ROG Xbox Ally is a gaming computer with a handheld docking station running Microsoft Windows operating system.

Functionally similar to OEM docks, but available in seemingly endless combinations, self-powered non-OEM docks still produce multiple connections from one port, only instead of extracting them from internal chipsets, they create them inside the dock using converters. Typically USB-C or Thunderbolt-3 based, they incorporate a range of converters such as USB display adapters or a full external GPU (eGPU), audio chipsets, NICs, storage enclosures, modems and memory card readers, or even PCI Express card slots connected through an internal USB hub or PCI Express bridge to give the host computer access to extra connections it did not previously possess. Because they are generally vendor neutral, they often support external device charging, more external monitors, and are more flexible to install. They are often the go-to choice for mixed device offices/workplaces to ease complications in deployments.

== Notebook/laptop stands and risers ==
Notebook/laptop stands are sometimes referred to as docking stations, They are an accessory designed to physically support a computer that is placed on it, typically to raise its screen up to a more ergonomic height, provide cooling, or just to conserve desk space. Some more sophisticated versions actually include advanced interfaces allowing high-quality video, high-speed USB and up to 10Gb Ethernet connections. These typically have a high-speed USB-C or Thundertbolt interface.

== Notebook/laptop shells ==
A regular notebook/laptop that does not include CPU, GPU, RAM and/or storage. A smartphone is inserted into the empty space within to act as a replacement for those missing features. Those docks are sometimes referred to as lapdocks or LapDock, a portmanteau of laptop and dock.

== Vehicle docks ==
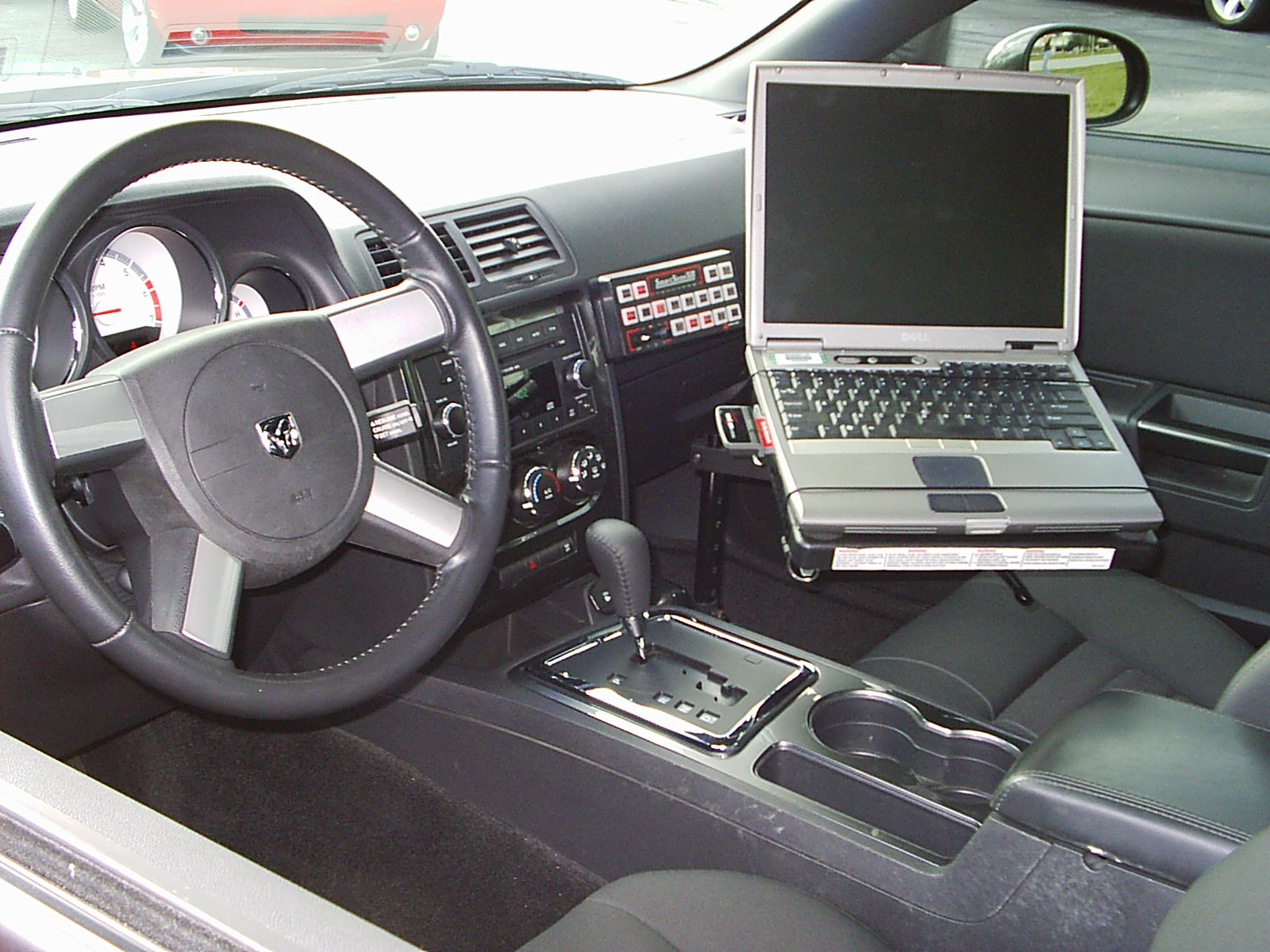
Vehicle dock with Dell laptop

Mobile docking stations, also sometimes referred to as vehicle mounts, provide stable platforms for notebook, laptop and tablet operation in vehicles. Many industries have adopted mobile computing and hence operators wish to have their vehicles fully equipped as mobile field offices, commonly referred to as mobile offices. As of 2015 organizations use mobile docking stations in sectors such as (for example): enforcement, electricity, telecommunications, the military, emergency medical services, fire, construction, insurance, real-estate, agriculture, oil, gas, transportation, warehousing, food-distribution, surveying, and landscaping.

Some manufacturers design mobile docking stations specially to withstand the rigors of travel; such products may have MIL-STD 810E construction specifications for vibration and impact.

Mobile docking stations usually come mated to an armature, laptop desk or standard rack in order to provide the ability to position the computer in a vehicle in a safe and ergonomic position. As with all docking stations, a mobile docking station will provide the user with a means to quickly and easily dock and undock the computer. In addition, some mobile docking stations provide a security lock to discourage theft.

=== Types of vehicle-based docking stations ===
- Car Mounts are designed for use with most popular automobiles.
- Truck Mounts are designed for use with most popular pickup trucks, vans, SUVs and heavy-duty trucks.
- Cart Mounts and Forklift Mounts are designed to mount notebook, laptop & tablet computers on forklifts and warehouse carts.

=== Vehicle mount components ===
Basic components in the design of computer vehicle mounts include:

- Docking station: The actual station or cradle in which the mobile PC rests. These stations may come equipped with additional functionality, such as charging and USB ports.
- Motion attachments: Movable components of a mounting system that attach between the pole or tube and the mount base. These come in a number of varieties, allowing the user to configure their mount's range of motion to desired specifications.
- Mounting base: Attaches the mounting system to the vehicle. This element is commonly composed of rugged materials such as steel. Tunnel mounts attach to the raised floor area (drive shaft tunnel) between the driver and passenger. Passenger side mounts attach to floor on the passenger side of the vehicle. Console mounting brackets attach to an existing vehicle center console. Trunk mounts provide mounting options for use inside car trunks.
- Poles and tubes: Attachments that allow the user to adjust the length and particular setup of the mount for the particular vehicle style.

Docking systems are shipped in their individual components, requiring the user to install and configure the device.

- Ergonomic Docking Stations: These are intended to both dock the laptop to offer power and Video connectivity and support the laptop screen at a height that allows a comfortable ergonomic view of the screen.

== See also ==
- Carputer
- Dock connector
- USB hub
- USB-C
- Thunderbolt 3
