= Windows Continuum =

Desktop experience on mobile phone

Continuum
- Developer: Microsoft
- Initial release: 6 October 2015; 10 years ago
- Operating system: Windows 10 Mobile
- Platform: Microsoft Lumia devices, HP Elite x3
- Type: Mobile/desktop convergence
- License: Proprietary
- Website: Continuum Documentation

Continuum is a feature created by Microsoft in 2015, integrated into the Windows 10 Mobile operating system. It was designed to provide users with a desktop-like experience when connecting their smartphone to an external monitor. Continuum enabled supported smartphones to project a full-screen interface on a monitor using the phone’s hardware, but with a user interface resembling a desktop environment.

== Functionality ==
Continuum allowed a Windows 10 Mobile device to connect to an external monitor either wirelessly, via protocols like Miracast, or through a wired accessory, such as the Microsoft Display Dock. When connected, the smartphone’s interface expanded into a desktop-like environment, featuring a taskbar and support for keyboard and mouse input. While Continuum emulated a desktop experience, it was limited to running apps from the Universal Windows Platform (UWP), which were designed to scale across various screen sizes. However, traditional Windows desktop applications were not supported, which limited its functionality compared to a full Windows PC.

== Supported devices ==
Continuum was featured on several high-end Windows 10 Mobile devices, including the Microsoft Lumia 950 and Lumia 950 XL, both launched in 2015. These devices could connect to external displays either wirelessly or via the Microsoft Display Dock, which provided ports for HDMI, USB, and DisplayPort. Other manufacturers, such as HP, also incorporated Continuum into their devices, such as the HP Elite x3, a smartphone aimed at business users.

== Limitations ==
Continuum faced several limitations, most notably its inability to run standard desktop applications. Since only UWP apps were supported in Continuum's desktop mode, the range of available applications was significantly smaller compared to a full Windows 10 desktop. This limitation reduced its attractiveness for users who required desktop-class software for productivity or professional tasks. Additionally, with the discontinuation of Windows 10 Mobile in 2019, the development and support for Continuum were effectively ended.

== Reception and legacy ==
Continuum received mixed reviews. While praised for its innovative approach to transforming a smartphone into a desktop-like device, it was seen as limited by the small library of UWP apps and the absence of support for traditional desktop applications. These constraints, along with the decline of the Windows 10 Mobile platform, contributed to its lack of widespread adoption.

Despite its discontinuation, Continuum influenced the development of other mobile computing solutions, such as Samsung DeX and Huawei EMUI, both of which offer similar smartphone-to-desktop functionality.

== See also ==
- Samsung DeX
- Windows 10 Mobile
- Universal Windows Platform
- HP Elite X3
