= SmartThings =

American technology company

SmartThings Inc.
- Type: Subsidiary
- Industry: Home automation
- Founded: 2012; 14 years ago
- Founders: Alex Hawkinson; Andrew Brooks; Jeff Hagins; Ben Edwards; James Stolp; Scott Vlaminck; Jesse O'Neill-Oine
- Headquarters: Mountain View, California, United States
- Areas served: Australia, Canada, Europe, New Zealand, United Kingdom, United States
- Parent: Samsung Electronics
- Website: www.smartthings.com

SmartThings Inc. is an American home automation company headquartered in Mountain View, California. Since August 2014 it is a subsidiary of Samsung Electronics.

Founded in 2012, it focuses on the development of eponymous automation software and an associated array of client applications and cloud platforms for smart homes and the consumer Internet of things.

== History ==
SmartThings was conceived by co-founder and once-CEO Alex Hawkinson in 2011. Hawkinson tells that his family's unoccupied mountain house in Colorado was extensively damaged by water pipes that first froze and subsequently burst resulting in some $80,000 worth of damage. Hawkinson noted that he could have prevented the damages had he known what was happening inside the house. Through 2011 and 2012, Hawkinson and his SmartThings co-founders worked to build a prototype of their desired solution to such problems. That prototype would go on to form the basis of a successful Kickstarter campaign which the developers launched in September 2012 and that would go on to secure US$1.2 million in backing, making it the second largest, smart-home focussed crowdfunding project to date.

Raising $3 million in a December 2012 seed funding round, SmartThings would go on to commercially launch its products in August 2013 before raising a further 12.5 million in a Series A funding round in late 2013.

In August 2014, Samsung Electronics announced that it had reached an agreement to acquire SmartThings. The financial terms of the deal were never publicly disclosed but were estimated as high as $200 million by some trade publications at the time.

== Products and services ==
Initially SmartThings produced a suite of custom hardware and software services, including smart home hubs and sensors. In June 2020, SmartThings' engineering head Mark Benson announced that SmartThings would pivot away from manufacturing its own hardware and instead focus on software. The company hopes to enlist other companies to manufacture and distribute SmartThings hardware. In October 2020, SmartThings announced that Aeotec will take over its European hardware line. In December 2020, Aeotec revealed that it would also manage the SmartThings hardware portfolio throughout Australia, Canada, the United Kingdom, and the United States.

As of February 2021, SmartThings develops software and cloud services.
