= Pete Silver & Will McLean =

British architects

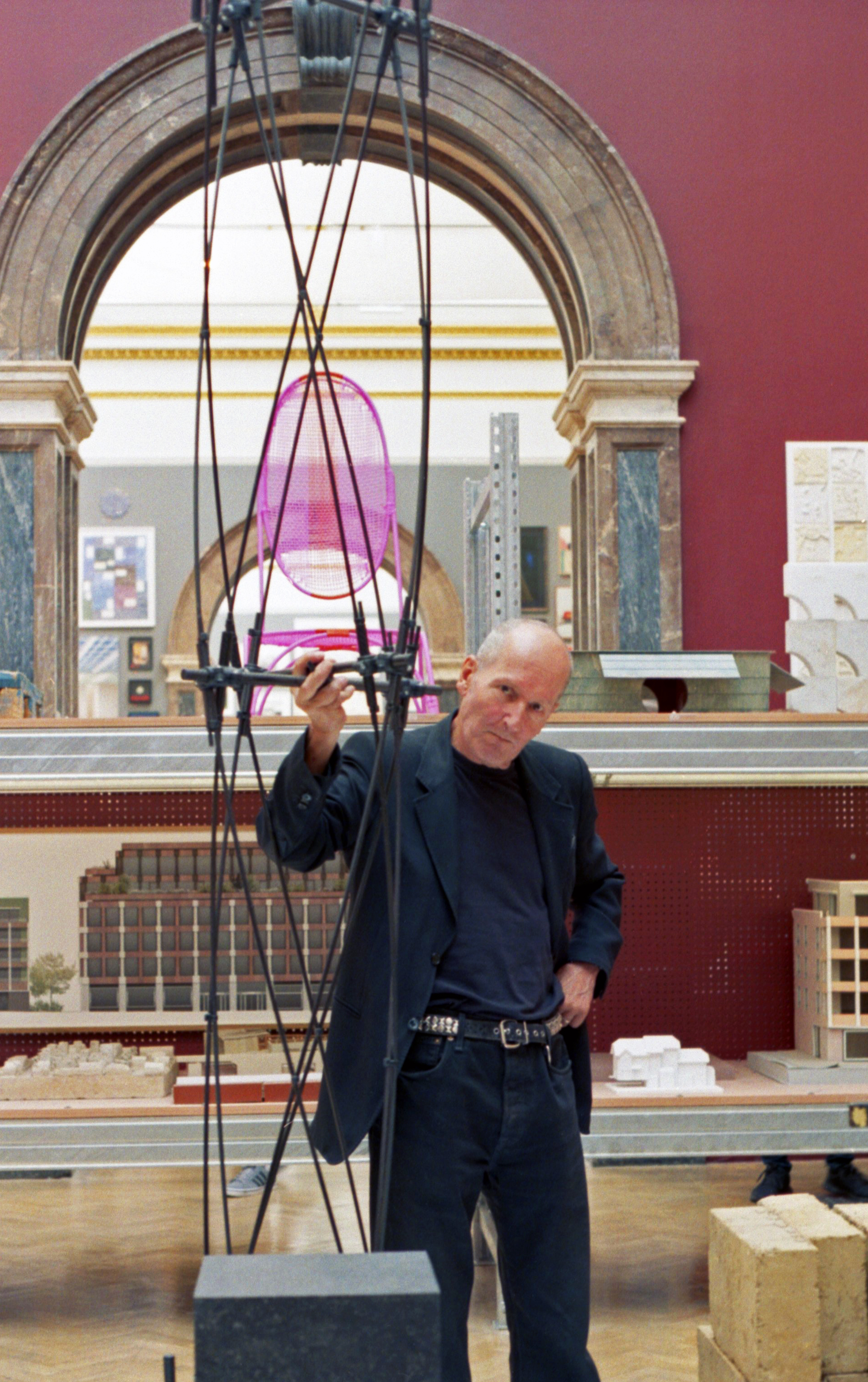
Pete Silver

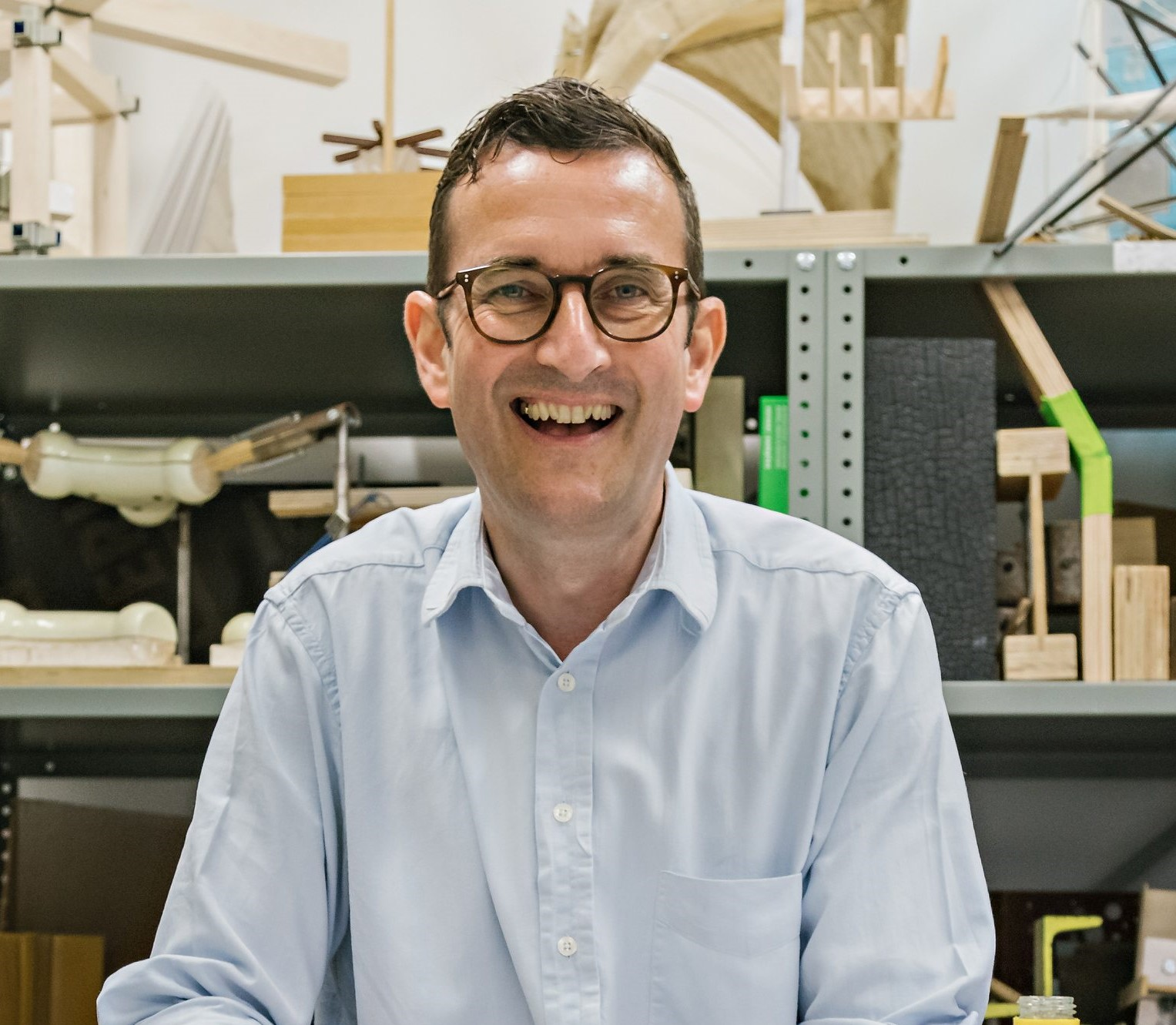
Dr Will McLean

Pete Silver & Will McLean are two British architectural practitioners, educators, writers, and technical theorists who work together as a duo. They have taught at the Architectural Association, The Bartlett (University College London), and The University of Westminster's School of Architecture and the Built environment, thus gaining a privileged position in the contemporary London architectural scene.

== Background ==
Will McLean is a Doctor of Philosophy and artist Bruce McLean's son. He trained at the Architectural Association under Will Alsop OBE RA and Professor John Frazer. McLean has worked on a series of projects with Bruce McLean, most notably Dalry Primary School in North Ayrshire completed in 2007 (www.primaryspace.net), and with US architect and artist Adam Kalkin, working on such projects as 'Quik Build' container housing. He has had a regular feature, covering technical innovations, in Architectural Design magazine - McLean's Nuggets, and was an Editor of Construction History - the International Journal of the Construction History Society.

Pete Silver worked for Solon Housing Association in South London with architects such as Patrick Keiller, Edward Cullinan and Walter Segal. He trained at the Architectural Association under Professors John Frazer and Gordon Pask, and became a researcher in the Land Use Research Unit at King's College London, gaining a unique insight into Professor Alice Coleman's ground-breaking, if controversial work on post-war housing regeneration. Silver was for many years a director of the Chartered Practice Architects (CPA) Ltd. and holds a UK patent - GB2594037 - for a novel type of lightweight, structural diagrid.

== Collaborative career ==
In 2001, Silver and McLean joined the School of Architecture and the Built environment at the University of Westminster in order to jointly head the Technical Studies Department. They have co-curated a highly successful public lecture series and co-authored six books around the subject of architectural technology:

- Fabrication: the designer's guide (Architectural Press);
- Introduction to Architectural Technology (Laurence King Publishing - available in 9 languages). Note: for this publication, the authors devised new, simplified taxonomies for structural components and for structural logic as a basis for the work of Heino Engel and others;
  I.A.T. 3
- Structural Engineering for Architects: A Handbook (Laurence King Publishing, co-authored with engineer Peter Evans - available in 4 languages);
- Air Structures (Laurence King Publishing);
- Environmental Design Sourcebook: Innovative Ideas for a Sustainable Built Environment (RIBA Publications);
  Structural Logic taxonomy from I.A.T. 3 - 2D SHAPES
- Sustainable and Regenerative Materials for Architecture - a sourcebook (Laurence King Publishing).
  Structural Logic taxonomy from I.A.T. 3 - 3D SURFACES

== Bibliography ==
- Frazer J.H (1995), An Evolutionary Architecture, Themes VII, Architectural Association, London, UK. (Contributions by Silver) (out of print but free download at http://www.aaschool.ac.uk/publications/ea/intro.html)
- Silver, Pete and McLean, William and Veglio, Simon (2006) Fabrication: the designers guide: the illustrated works of twelve specialist UK fabricators, Architectural Press, Oxford, UK. ISBN 0-7506-6558-0
- Silver, Pete and McLean, William (2008) An Introduction to Architectural Technology, Laurence King, London, UK ISBN 978-1-85669-566-4 (Second Edition published 2013, Third Edition published 2021)
- Silver, Pete and McLean, William and Evans, Peter (2014) Structural Engineering for Architects: A Handbook, Laurence King, London, UK ISBN 978-1-78067-055-3
- McLean, William and Silver, Pete (2015) Air Structures, Laurence King (in the series Form + Technique), London, UKISBN 978-1-78067-482-7
- McLean, William and Silver, Pete (2021) Environmental Design Sourcebook: Innovative Ideas for a Sustainable Built Environment, RIBA Publications, London, UK ISBN 9781859469606
- McLean, William and Silver, Pete (2025) Sustainable and Regenerative Materials for Architecture - a sourcebook, Laurence King London, UK ISBN 978-1529433272
- McLean, William (2008) Quik Build: Adam Kalkin’s ABC of Container Architecture, Bibliothèque McLean, London, UK ISBN 978-0-9558868-0-5(Also in the series Form + Technique, see: Rivas Adrover, Esther (2015) Deployable Structures, Laurence King, London, UK ISBN 978-1-78067-483-4)

Periodicals

- Pete Silver and Peter Fluck (2001) Non-Linear dynamical Systems, In: A.D. Magazine, Architectural Design Profile No 123.
- Silver et al., (2001) Prototypical Applications of Cybernetic Systems in Architectural Contexts, In: Kybernetes, Volume 30 Number 7/8.
- McLean, William (2005–2009) McLean's nuggets. In: Architectural Design (various). Wiley, Chichester, UK.
- McLean, William and Silver, Pete (2019) AMPS Proceedings 17-2 - Education, Design and Practice – Understanding skills in a Complex World, Technical Skills for Students of Architecture.

== Hosted Lectures ==
The Technical Studies Lectures, hosted by the University of Westminster, offers a platform for the dissemination of ideas from such speakers as those in the following, non-exhaustive list (archived at https://www.youtube.com/@WillMcLeanTechnicalStudies/videos and at https://technicalstudies.tumblr.com/):

- Simon Allford, Will Alsop, Michael Ashby, Philip Ball, Gianni Botsford, Dave Carr-Smith, Andrew Cripps, Alex De Rijke, John Frazer, Thomas Heatherwick, Richard Horden, Eva Jiricna, Patrick Keiller, Tim Macfarlane, Ben Morris, Martin Pawley, Sergio Pellegrino (James Watt International Medal), Cedric Price, Esther Rivas Adrover, Rupert Sheldrake, Julien Vincent, John Zerning.

Former students include:

- Paul Bavister, Jason Bruges, Andrew Whiting, Usman Haque, Chris Leung

Book launch for Environmental Design Sourcebook, recorded at the University of Westminster: see https://www.youtube.com/watch?v=AZhJdlH0KTI

Pete Silver on AI - What is it? And why now? recorded at the University of Westminster: see https://www.youtube.com/watch?v=MDkN--7z-kE&t=192s
