= AQE (disambiguation) =

AQE or Aqe may refer to:

- Air Quality Egg
- Spanish Quidditch Association (AQE, Spanish: Asociación Quidditch España, member of the International Quadball Association
- Aqe, a bottlenose dolphin in Marineland of Florida
- AQE common entrance assessment in the education in Northern Ireland
