= Radiation monitoring in Japan =

Radiation levels in Japan are continuously monitored in a number of locations, and a large number stream their data to the internet. Some of these locations are mandated by law for nuclear power plants and other nuclear facilities. Some of them serve as part of a national monitoring network for use in a nuclear emergency. Others are independent monitoring stations maintained by individuals.

Interest in the levels of radiation all over the nation increased dramatically during the Fukushima I nuclear accidents. At that time, a number of people began streaming from monitoring stations, and some international organizations conducted special monitoring operations to assess the state of radiation levels near the power plant and throughout Japan.

== Monitoring at Nuclear Power Plants ==
Regulations per the Japanese Nuclear Safety Commission prescribe some standards that a monitoring system at a power producing nuclear plant must adhere to. For the purposes of regulation, monitoring systems are divided into two categories.

- Category 1: Design of the monitoring system has to fit S-class seismic criteria and have diversity and independence in the channels that constitute the system.
- Category 2: These detectors are connected to the plant emergency power system.

Additionally, a condition for both categories is that it have the ability to monitor continuously and record its results.

During normal operation, plants have to monitor gas and liquid radioactive effluent releases. The only type that requires continuous monitoring is radioactive noble gasses, although some require monitoring only for every discharge. Other types of radiation must be monitored weekly or monthly according to the regulations.

Operating power plant sites stream readings from environmental radiation detectors located around or on periphery of the site, detectors measuring radiation levels leaving the plant stack (gaseous effluents), and detectors monitoring the radiation of the discharged waste heat water. Official monitoring websites of nuclear power plants in Japan are listed below.

== Monitoring Organizations and Individuals ==
Radiation monitoring in Japan is performed and publicly streamed by a number of governmental agencies and non-governmental organizations and individuals.

=== SPEEDI Network ===
The Nuclear Safety Division of the Ministry of Education, Culture, Sports, Science and Technology streams information from a national network of detectors, called the System for Prediction of Environment Emergency Dose Information (SPEEDI). It has been called a "computer-based decision support system" by researchers, and its function is for real-time dose assessment in radiological emergencies. In 1993 it had been developed for domestic local range accidents and was in the process to scale up to a national scale emergency response program linked to local governments. A worldwide version (WSPEEDI) was under development.

==== Use in Fukushima Daiichi nuclear disaster ====
The government recommendation that people voluntarily evacuate from places in the 20–30 km range from the Fukushima Daiichi plant came after the Nuclear Safety Commission watchdog released forecasts based on SPEEDI measurements. It was found that radiation levels differed significantly based on geography and wind direction, and it was suggested that because of this, the way evacuation areas were being designated should be changed and become more detailed. The Yomiuri Shinbun calculated radiation doses based on data from the Fukushima prefectural government and found they corresponded with the forecasts.

SPEEDI figured in controversy surrounding the Japanese government's use of the data and its failure to use it in planning evacuation routes. Data on the dispersal of radioactive materials were provided to the U.S. forces by the Japanese Ministry for Science a few days after March 11; however, the data was not shared with the Japanese public until March 23. According to Watanabe's testimony before the Diet, the US military was given access to the data "to seek support from them" on how to deal with the nuclear disaster. Although SPEEDI's effectiveness was limited by not knowing the amounts released in the disaster, and thus was considered "unreliable", it was still able to forecast dispersal routes and could have been used to help local governments designate more appropriate evacuation routes.

=== Ishikawa Lab, Hino, Tokyo ===
Following the Fukushima disaster, a lab in Hino Tokyo received major attention after a researcher streamed readings from a Geiger counter on his website.

=== Pachube ===
The Pachube (pronounced Patch bay) site allows users to stream various sensor data to the web in real time and was put to use for monitoring radiation by a large number of users after March 2011. There was only 1 location streaming into Pachube before the accident, but a large number have since started to stream to the site. The community has converged on a standard way to report the information in order to disseminate the large variety of sources, such as detector model.

The manager of developer relations at Pachube said that he foresaw a range of applications of the data, including cell phone applications. He also noted that the sensors will allow people to cross-check readings for accuracy and could inspire healthy skepticism. Pachube has hundreds of Geiger counters streaming, but there are still concerns that these may not be dense enough.

In 2012 Pachube was acquired by Cosm which in 2013 was renamed xively.

=== DataPoke Foundation ===
The privately operated non-profit organization, DataPoke Foundation, performed independent monitoring of the Fukushima Daiichi NPP contamination dispersion. The project, Project:Fukushima, focuses on publicly publishing data, observations, measurements and dispersion plots of the Fukushima NPP contamination, and aggregating public opinion of these observations in order to reach a more complete understanding of the Fukushima Daiichi NPP catastrophe.

=== RDTN / Safecast ===
The RDTN.org began as an early crowd-sourcing initiative to sponsor and assist in gathering, monitoring and disseminating radiation data from the affected areas. RDTN intended their independent measurements to provide additional context for the radiation data reported by the official factors, to supplement and not to replace the data of the competent authorities. RDTN successfully launched a micropatronage campaign to raise $33,000 in order to buy 100 Geiger counters to jumpstart their network. In April hackers at tokyohackerspace prototyped an Arduino-based geiger counter shield to upload data from geiger counters including from RDTN supplied counters. This prototype later developed into Safecast mobile geo-tagged radiation sensors. RDTN people attributed their success to crisis urgency. In late April, one month after its start, RDTN folded itself into Safecast with the joint announcement that RDTN was rebranded as Safecast, a citizens' network which continues monitoring radiation levels in Japan.
