= Bed-making =

Arranging bedding on a bed to prepare it for use

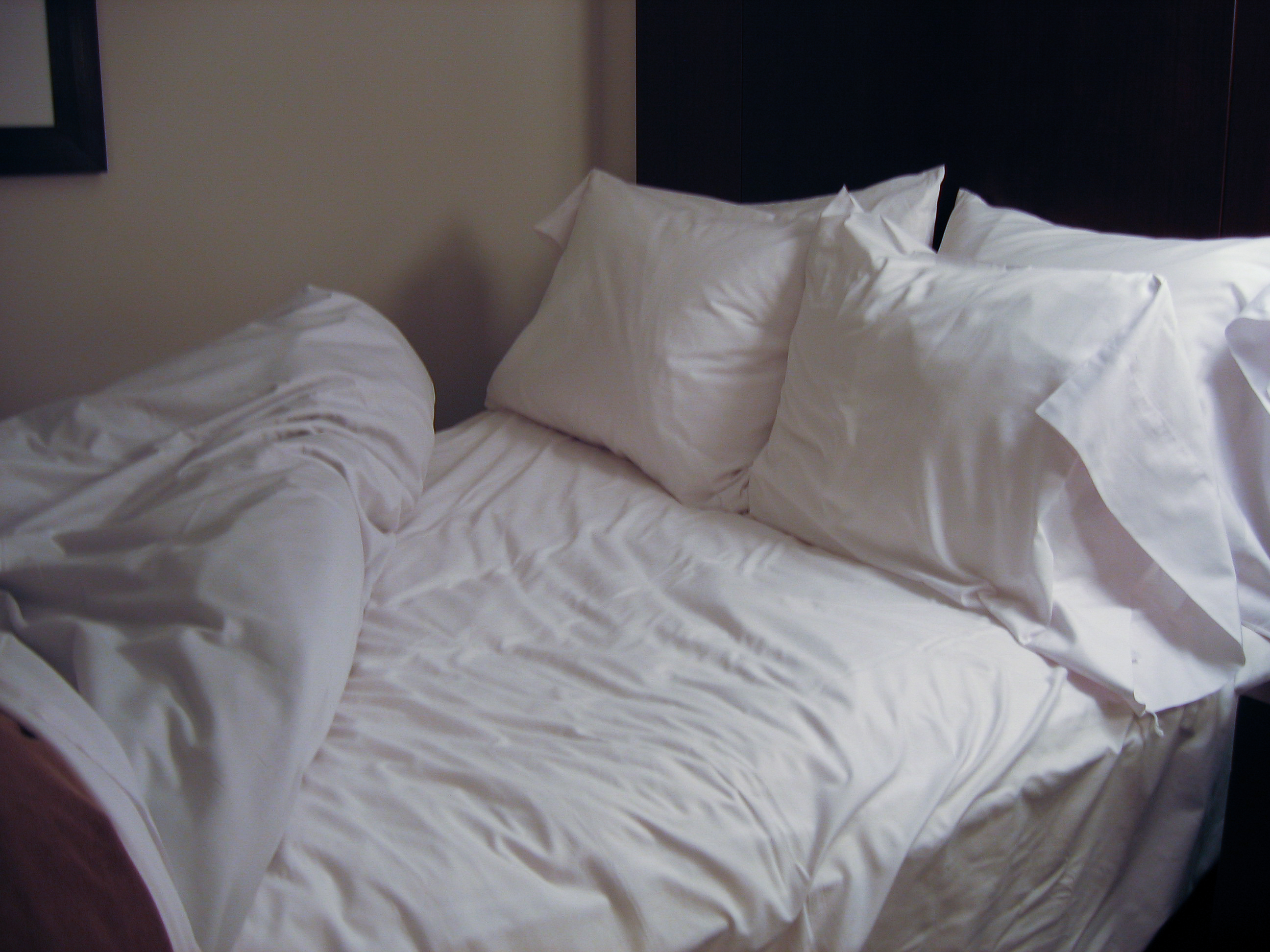
An unmade hotel bed

Bed-making is the act of arranging the bedsheets and other bedding on a bed, to prepare it for use. It is a household chore, but is also performed in establishments including hospitals, hotels, and military or educational residences. Bed-making is also a common childhood chore. Research suggests that unmade beds help to keep out dust mites.

== History ==
Beds must sometimes be made to exacting standards, demanded by nurses or military personnel. In a hospital or other health-care environment, beds must sometimes be made while occupied by a patient. Specialised techniques are taught to healthcare staff to enable beds to be made efficiently with due care for the patient. Moving the patient out of the bed before remaking it is the preferred option.

There are different bed-making techniques, such as "hospital corners" and "mitred corners". Military recruits are often taught how to make a neat and tidy bed with hospital corners. Military personnel are expected to fold the bed very tightly, in some cases so that a coin can bounce off it.

Making hospital corners

Starting in 2012, many self-making beds that automatically rearrange the bedding are in development and in use.

== Record ==
Guinness World Records reports that the record time for two people to make a bed "with one blanket, two sheets, an undersheet, an uncased pillow, one pillowcase, one counterpane and hospital corners" is 14.0 seconds. This feat was achieved by two nurses from the Royal Masonic Hospital in London in 1993.
