= Bruce McLean =

Scottish sculptor, performance artist and painter

- Born: 1944 (age 81–82); Glasgow, Scotland
- Education: Glasgow School of Art; Saint Martin's School of Art
- Occupation: Artist
- Father: Will McLean
- Awards: John Moores Painting Prize

Bruce McLean (born 1944) is a Scottish sculptor, performance artist and painter.

McLean was born in Glasgow and studied at Glasgow School of Art from 1961 to 1963, and at Saint Martin's School of Art, London, from 1963 to 1966. At Saint Martin's, McLean studied with Anthony Caro and Phillip King. In reaction to what he regarded as the academicism of his teachers he began making sculpture from rubbish.

McLean has produced paintings, sculptures, ceramics, prints, work with film, theatre and books. McLean was Head of Graduate Painting at The Slade School of Fine Art London He has had one-man exhibitions including Tate Gallery in London, Arnolfini, Bristol, The New Art Gallery, Walsall, The Modern Art Gallery in Vienna and Museum of Modern Art, Oxford.

In 1985, he won the John Moores Painting Prize.

Mclean lives and works in London. His son is the architect Will McLean.
