= Self-making bed =

Bed designed to prepare itself

A self-making bed (also known as a smart bed) is designed to automatically rearrange the bedding on a bed and prepare itself for use.

== History ==
In 2008, inventor Enrico Berruti featured his self-making bed, dubbed "Selfy", at The International Exhibition of Inventions in Geneva, Switzerland. The bed makes itself by stretching and smoothing the sheets over the mattress by using metal rails that connect to the bed sheets alongside the bed.

In 2017, the company Smartduvet released a fabric to make the bed through a network of air chambers. This is a breathable layer that is made of lightweight material. When activated it inflates the sheet's air chamber, placing the duvet and sheets back in position. Using an app, the user can preset a different bed-making time for each day of the week. It does not replace the existing bed and is non-permanent so it can be used with existing duvet and duvet coverbedding.

== See also ==
- Bed-making
- Smart home
