= Interactive architecture =

Interactive architecture refers to the branch of architecture which deals with buildings, structures, surfaces and spaces that are designed to change, adapt and reconfigure in real-time response to people (their activity, behaviour and movements), as well as the wider environment. This is usually achieved by embedding sensors, processors and effectors as a core part of a building's nature and functioning in such a way that the form, structure, mood or program of a space can be altered in real-time. Interactive architecture encompasses building automation but goes beyond it by including forms of interaction engagements and responses that may lie in pure communication purposes as well as in the emotive and artistic realm, thus entering the field of interactive art. It is also closely related to the field of Responsive architecture and the terms are sometimes used interchangeably, but the distinction is important for some.

== Examples of interactive architecture ==
While now quite common (most large-scale new buildings are built around environmentally responsive technologies, sustainability systems and user-configurable environments) earlier notable examples of interactive architecture include:

- Tower of Winds (Yokohama, Japan, 1987) – Toyo Ito
- Kunsthaus (Graz, Austria, 2003) – Peter Cook and Colin Fournier
- Galleria Centercity (Seoul, South Korea, 2008) – UN Studio
- The Shed (New York City, USA, 2019) – Diller Scofidio + Renfro

== Conceptual development of interactive architecture ==
Early contributions to the ideas behind interactive architecture include New Babylon (Constant Nieuwenhuys) (a massive global city formed from "a series of linked transformable structures") and Cedric Price's Fun Palace ("Designed as a flexible framework into which programmable spaces can be plugged, the structure has as its ultimate goal the possibility of change at the behest of its users"), later given form in his Inter-Action Centre.

Nicholas Negroponte's book Soft Architecture Machines (1975) proposed architecture machines "not simply used as aids in the design of buildings—they serve as buildings in themselves. Man will live in living, intelligent machines or cognitive physical environments that can immediately respond to his needs or wishes or whims". He had earlier founded the Architecture Machine Group at MIT in 1968, creating the lab "as a test bed for interactive computers, sensors and programs that sought to change the manner in which computers and humans interacted with each other" which later grew into MIT Media Lab.

Other notable contributors to the conceptual development of the field include:

- Gordon Pask, who offered "a paradigm for an intelligent environment that not only adapts to its use but also actively puts this use in question, requiring new actions from its users".
- John Frazer, who posits that architecture should be living and evolving, "to achieve in the built environment the symbiotic behaviour and metabolic balance that are characteristic of the natural environment".
- Ranulph Glanville, who proposed that "intelligent architecture will join with us in a debate, the subject of which will be how we might live so we (the architecture and the inhabitant) gain effectiveness and delight in living (forging lives) together."
- Stephen Gage, Professor at the Bartlett School of Architecture who founded the Interactive Architecture Workshop, and wrote "The 21st Century designer will have to be fluent in automatic, reactive & interactive design, i.e. Time based design in its three forms. Designers & architects are faced with an essentially new extension to their craft"
- Usman Haque, who makes the distinction between multi-loop 'interactive' and 'merely reactive' environments, encouraging the "goal of authentic multi-loop interaction in actual built architectural projects, forsaking the easier route of creating merely reactive works" and extended this to explore "connected environments" and the internet of things. He has also extrapolated from Gordon Pask's work to propose architecture that "can choose what it senses, either by having ill-defined sensors or by dynamically determining its own perceptual categories, then it moves a step closer to true autonomy which would be required in an authentically interactive system".
- Molly Wright Steenson, who has written about how computational, cybernetic, and artificial intelligence researchers engage with architects and architectural problems
- Ben Sweeting, who uses cybernetics to explore the connections between architecture, epistemology and ethics, connecting it directly to interactive architecture
- Rebecca Parsons, who defined evolutionary architecture as a supporting, guiding, incremental change across multiple dimension

== Technologies used in interactive architecture ==
Interactive architecture is part of the Internet of things, a term first coined by Kevin Ashton of Procter & Gamble, later MIT's Auto-ID Center, in 1999, can include both interior and exterior elements. Within the interior, many technologies are competing to see who will emerge as the dominant communicative signal. 4GLTE LTE (telecommunication) being replaced eventually by 5G, is the obvious solution; however, visible light communication or Li-Fi, a term first introduced by Harald Haas during a 2011 TEDGlobal talk in Edinburgh, is gaining ground as research into this type of data transfer method increases. Interactive architecture and designing buildings with this technology embedded in it is essential in the development of smart cities.

Another essential element in the development of a smart city is the landscape architecture. The space in-between buildings used by the public, or the public realm as it is more commonly termed. There are two levels of communication within the public realm and the difference between the two are commonly accepted as the differentiation between IoT and IoE. IoE, or the Internet of Everything, was a phrase first used by Cisco in an attempt to achieve polarity with competitors that had embraced the term IoT. In Cisco's definition, however, they highlighted interaction with the human node as one main difference between IoT and IoE.

The two public realm communication protocols that make that space a smart space are:

- The Intelligent Realm, or i-realm, defined as a realm designed with embedded information and communication technology, which allows the silo elements of that space, lighting, ventilation, traffic signals, transportation, waste management, to communicate with one another for the purpose of making that urban area more efficient and effective.
- The second communication protocol is the Interactive Realm, defined as incorporating all of the technology needed to create an intelligent realm but in addition, using communication methods such as Global Positioning System, geo-fence, near-field communication and embedded Bluetooth Low Energy, to allow communication between the architecture of the space and the consumers of it. Sometimes referred to as the physical web by Google, an interactive realm uses exterior lighting, bollards, street furniture, bus stops and other elements to communicate to the public via their smartphone or tablet.

Whilst IoT concerns itself with communication between objects in order to make the design more efficient and interactive from an operational stand point. IoE also incorporates communication between embedded objects and user devices. The applications include wayfinding, safety, anti-terrorism, targeted advertising, general information such as history of the space or simply just to make the space more enjoyable.
