= Air Quality Egg =

Air pollution monitoring device

The Air Quality Egg (AQE) is an Internet of Things platform and hobbyist device for crowdsourced citizen monitoring of airborne pollutants. The device won widespread recognition when it was named one of the best projects on Kickstarter in 2012, and has been featured in a variety of media outlets. Data from each device is uploaded to Xively and published on the Air Quality Egg website. The device can be used with 3rd-party mobile apps such as Acculation's AQCalc.

== How it works (current version) ==
Version 2 of the AQE is a single unit, Wi-Fi connected device which can be configured using a cell phone. It has two variants; indoor and outdoor. The device can be fitted with sensors for CO_{2}, NO_{2}, SO_{2}, ozone, carbon monoxide, volatile organic compounds and particulates (PM10, PM2.5 and PM1.0). The particulate sensors can detect particles as small as 0.3 μm (microns), using two Plantower PMS5003 laser sensors.

== Accuracy ==
The PM2.5 measurements of the AQE version 2 had an R^{2} correlation factor of 0.79 to 0.85 with a professional reference sensor, in a field test run by the South Coast Air Quality Management District. (An R^{2} of 1 indicates perfect correlation, whereas 0 indicates a complete lack of correlation).

== History ==
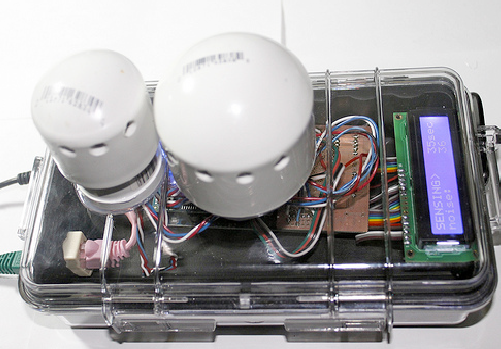
An early version of the Air Quality Egg.

The AQE grew out of Internet of Things meetup groups in New York City and Amsterdam, led by Pachube evangelist Ed Borden. The concept was conceived at a Parsons/New School hackathon. It is manufactured and sold by the start-up company WickedDevice LLC in Ithaca, NY. The name "Air Quality Egg" was created by company co-founder Dirk Swart.

Originally, there were two versions of the device: an Arduino shield for use by hobbyists, and a more consumer-ready "hobbyist kit" device. The latter consists of two identical-looking plastic enclosures resembling white eggs. The base unit is connected to the user's Ethernet LAN connection. A second unit monitors NO_{2} and CO levels and reports these readings every few minutes to the base unit via a custom wireless protocol. The base unit reports these readings to Xively and the AQE website. Add-ons are available for purchase on the website, that add PM2.5 dust, Ozone, and VOC sensors.

== Competition ==
Despite being labelled a not-consumer-ready "hobbyist" device by the manufacturer, the AQE is one of the few de facto commercially available, comprehensive Internet of Things pollution monitors on the US market.

A number of competing devices have been announced, such as Chemisense Wearable and Foobot (formerly Alima).

Another US crowdsourced air quality monitoring device is CitizenSensor, but it is listed an outgoing project, DIY, and not available for purchase.

A comprehensive Internet of Things air pollution monitoring device is China's iKair (pronounced "I Care"), but it has a closed, proprietary platform rather than the AQE's open source hardware and open data design.

In 2014, IBM announced a partnership with the government of China for analytics software to process data from pollution sensors.

== See also ==
- South Coast Air Quality Management District evaluates the performance of low-cost pollutant sensors such as the AQE and publishes evaluation reports on its website.
