= John Frazer (architect) =

British architectural academic

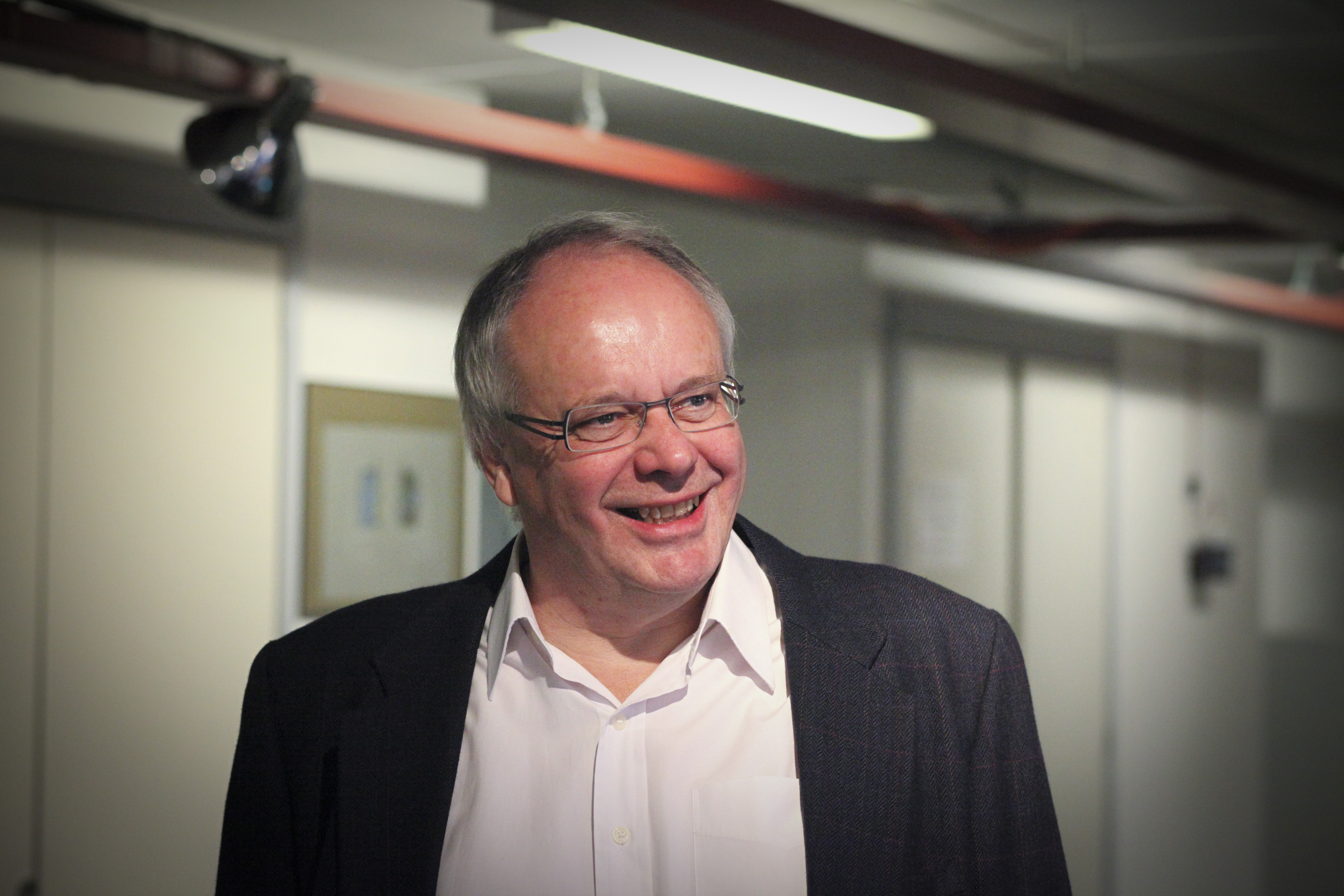

John Frazer (born 1945, Lancashire, England) is a British architectural academic.

Frazer's early work in computer technologies related to architecture, urbanism and design was developed at the Architectural Association in London, Cambridge University and the University of Ulster (where he was awarded a personal chair in 1984). He has been Swire Chair Professor, Head of the School of Design and Director of the Design Technology Research Centre at the Hong Kong Polytechnic University and Head of the School of Design at Queensland University of Technology (QUT) in Brisbane, Australia. He is Professor of Digital Design at The European Graduate School.

== Publication ==
Frazer J.H., An Evolutionary Architecture, Architectural Association, London, 1995
