= Xively =

- Company type: Subsidiary
- Industry: Computer software
- Founded: London, England (2007)
- Founder: Usman Haque
- Headquarters: Cambridge, Massachusetts, US
- Parent: Google
- Website: xively.com

Xively (formerly known as Cosm and Pachube) was an Internet of Things (IoT) platform owned by Google. Xively offered product companies a way to connect products, manage connected devices and the data they produce, and integrate that data into other systems. It is pronounced "zively" (rhymes with lively). Its domain name redirects to a Google page about Cloud IoT Core, though that has been retired.

== History ==
In 2007, London architect Usman Haque founded Pachube (pronounced Patch bay) as a data infrastructure and community for the Internet of Things. Following the nuclear accidents in Japan in 2011, Pachube was used by volunteers to interlink Geiger counters across the country to monitor the fallout. In July 2011, Pachube announced that they had been acquired by LogMeIn and renamed to Cosm. Cosm came out of beta development and was rebranded as Xively to become a Public Cloud for the IoT in May 2013.

On February 16, 2018, Google announced via official statement regarding acquiring Xively from LogMeIn on March 20, 2018.

== Products and services ==
=== Xively Cloud Services ===
A Platform as a Service built for the IoT. According to their website, this includes directory services, data services, a trust engine for security, and web-based management application. Xively's messaging is built on a publish-subscribe protocol called MQTT. The API supports REST, WebSockets, and MQTT.

=== Xively Business Services ===
The Xively Professional Services team has helped numerous companies successfully deploy IoT connected products into the market.

=== Xively Partner Network ===
Xively has partnered with chipset companies such as ARM, Atmel and TI as well as solution providers and IoT industry alliances like OASIS.

== Awards and industry recognition ==
- Best Cloud-Based Technology for Mobile [2014, GSMA Mobile World Congress]
- The World's Top 10 Most Innovative Companies in The Internet of Things [2014, Fast Company]
- Battle of the Platforms: Best Enabling Non Platform Technology [2013 and 2014, M2M Conference]
