= Usman Haque =

Architect and artist (born 1971)

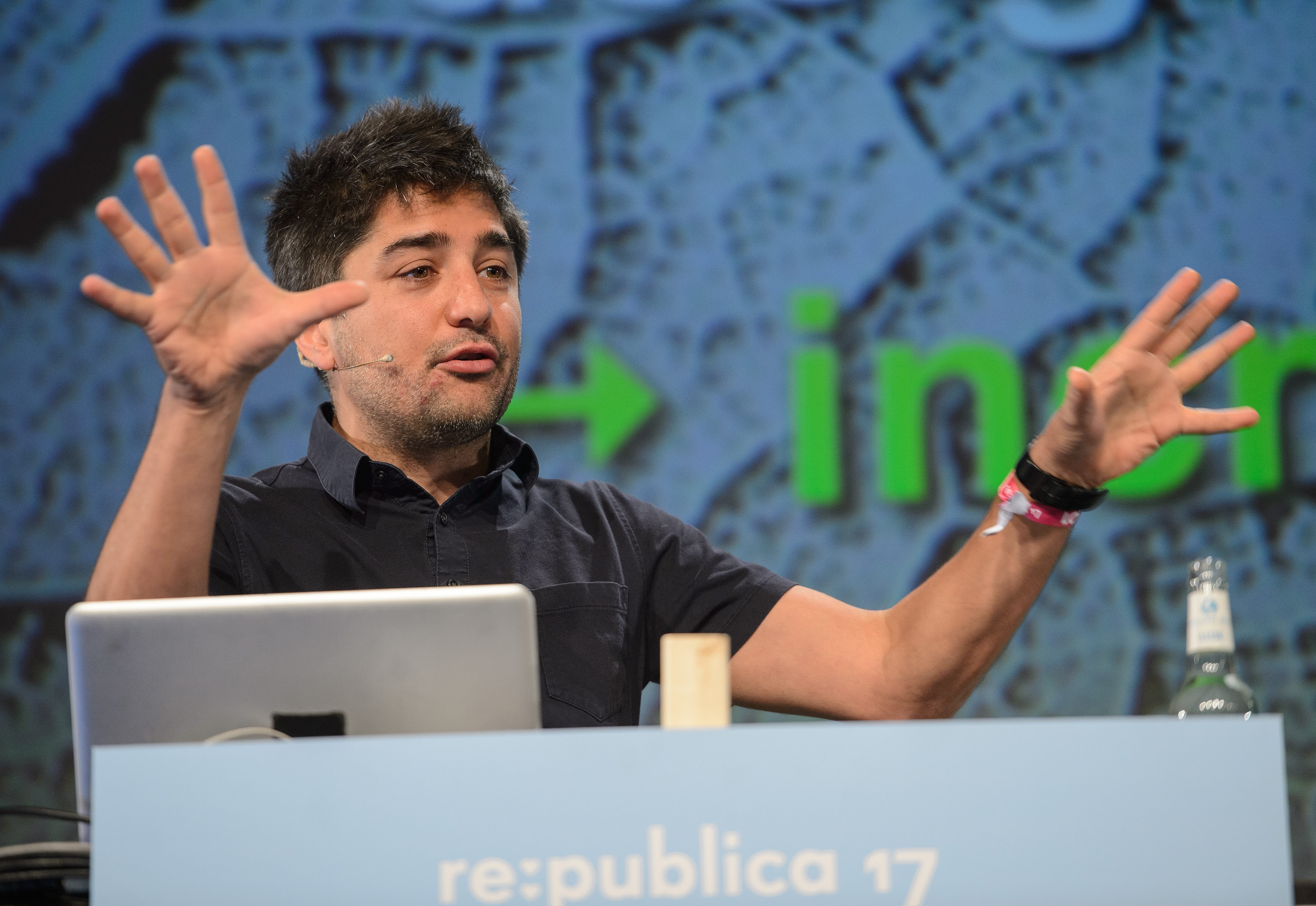

Usman Haque (born 1971) is an architect and artist who works with technology. He is known for designing large scale interactive installations and his contributions to Interactive architecture and the Internet of things.

Haque's interactive art has appeared at the Singapore Biennale (2006), London Fashion Week (2007) and has been exhibited at KUNSTEN Museum of Modern Art Aalborg, NTT InterCommunication Center, New York's Museum of Modern Art and Barbican Centre.

According to author Owen Hatherley, Haque’s work “defies conventional classification” and “is not what you would immediately think of as architecture”, often overlapping both digital art and interactive architecture.

Haque’s contribution to interactive architecture is to distinguish between ‘circular mutual reaction’ and ‘linear causal response’ in designing architectural structures and environments, building on Gordon Pask’s cybernetics theories in creating interactive spaces.

== Education ==
Haque studied architecture at the Bartlett School of Architecture and was part of the Bartlett Interactive Architecture Workshop.

== Selected projects ==
- Sky Ear, “a cloud of 1,000 helium balloons launched into the evening sky with a payload of mobile phones, sensor circuits and flashing LEDs”
- Open Burble, “a 70m tall structure consisting of 1000 extra-large helium balloons, supported by 140 carbon-fibre hexagonal units”
- Haunt, “a scientifically haunted room”
- Evoke, “a riot of projected colours...on the imposing 60 metre-high front of York Minster”
- Reconfigurable House, “an environment constructed from thousands of low tech components that can be “rewired” by visitors”
- Natural Fuse, “ a network of houseplants attached to the electrical system, which monitor energy use”

Others include Another Life, one of Haque’s permanent interactive installations, located in Bradford, UK; Assemblance, which “lets visitors sculpt and shapes beams of lasers” [sic]; Cinder, an augmented reality cat designed "to get students interacting closely with the modern technology"; and Starling Crossing, an “interactive road crossing that only appears when needed”.

In the internet of things he is known for founding Pachube in 2007, an IoT data platform that “enabled hundreds of Japanese civilians to quickly and easily share weather and radiation data in the aftermath of the Fukushima disaster”, acquired by LogMeIn in 2011, renamed Xively and sold to Google in 2018. He also founded Thingful, a search engine for the internet of things, in 2013.

== Awards and honors ==
Haque won a Japan Media Arts Festival Excellence Award in 2004 and was a Brit Insurance Design Awards winner in 2008. He was appointed a Design Council Ambassador in 2021 and in 2022 he joined the London Mayor's Data for London Advisory Board.
