= Kristina Shea =

Mechanical engineer

Kristina Shea is a mechanical engineer whose research topics include generative design, tensegrity structures, aquatic soft robotics, and 4D printing. She is a professor in the Department of Mechanical and Process Engineering at ETH Zurich, where she holds the chair in Engineering Design and Computing.

== Education and career ==
Shea studied mechanical engineering at Carnegie Mellon University, earning a bachelor's degree in 1993, master's in 1995, and PhD in 1997. Her doctoral dissertation, Essays of Discrete Structures: Purposeful Design of Grammatical Structures by Directed Stochastic Search, was supervised by Jonathan Cagan.

Shea came to Switzerland as a postdoctoral researcher at the École Polytechnique Fédérale de Lausanne in the Applied Computing and Mechanics Laboratory of the Department of Civil Engineering. She became a lecturer in engineering design at the University of Cambridge, and then from 2005 to 2012 she was a professor of virtual product development at the Technical University of Munich before taking her present position at ETH Zurich.

== Recognition ==
Shea won the 2001 Philip Leverhulme Prize in Engineering. She is a Fellow of the ASME, elected in 2013.
