= Four-dimensional product =

A four-dimensional product (4D product) considers a physical product as a life-like entity capable of changing form and physical properties autonomously over time. It is an evolving field of product design practice and research linked to similar concepts at the material scale (programmable matter and four-dimensional printing), however, typically utilizes sensors and actuators in order to respond to environmental and human conditions, modifying the shape, color, character and other physical properties of the product. In this way 4D products share similarities with responsive architecture, at the more human scale associated with products.

== History ==
The concept of imbuing products with similar life-like qualities has been an area of increasing research within academia and industry alike. However, researchers have used a variety of different terms to describe this research, for example transformational products, shape changing, kinetic, or in a more general sense, smart, connected, robotic or having a level of artificial intelligence.

Within industry, commercial examples of products capable of adaptation have received some attention. In 2005 Adidas released the Adidas 1 shoe, which was capable of adjusting the compression characteristics in the heel with each stride, and accommodate for the different requirements of the foot during different activities like walking or running. More recently in 2016, Nike released the HyperAdapt 1.0 shoe, capable of self-lacing as the user puts their foot into it. Additional micro adjustments were possible using manual controls, however, the designers claim a longer-term vision for such products to come alive and respond in real-time to user needs.

In 2008 BMW revealed a concept car called GINA which featured a fabric body stretched over a movable aluminium wire and carbon fiber frame, capable of flexing in certain areas to reveal details like door openings, or modify aerodynamic properties of the car in real time. The 2016 incarnation of this concept car, the BMW Vision Next 100, adopted similar capabilities with a more advanced flexible skin capable of expanding as the front wheels turn, reportedly reducing the drag coefficient of the car while cornering. Changes in product form can be used to improve product performance. While such a dynamic car body is yet to be seen on the mainstream market, elements of this transformation can be seen in modern Formula One racing cars. These vehicles have movable rear wing flaps to modify drag for overtaking in certain sections of a race (known as the Drag Reduction System or DRS). Consumer-level cars, like the Audi TT, are also capable of automatically increasing the rear spoiler angle at high speeds to increase traction and safety. This suggests these life-like movements are slowly finding their way into the mainstream.

== See also ==
- Actuator
- Autonomous robot
- Evolutionary robotics
- Fourth Industrial Revolution
- Industrial design
- Responsive computer-aided design
- Sensor
- Smart wearable system
