= Trame =

Design studio

TRAME
- Industry: Design, Art, Home Decor
- Founded: 2019
- Founder: Ismail Tazi
- Headquarters: Paris, France; New York, United States
- Website: www.trameparis.com

Trame is a contemporary design studio and curatorial platform based in Paris. Founded in 2019, the studio creates bespoke furniture, decor objects, and art through collaborations between global artisans and generative digital artists. It combines traditional craft techniques with generative design processes.

== History ==
Trame was founded in 2019 by Ismail Tazi.

== Design and products ==
Trame employs generative design—a method involving algorithmically produced forms—to create custom objects. The studio uses code to generate patterns and structures, which are then interpreted through manual production methods including weaving, glassblowing, and woodworking. TRAME collaborates with both artisans and digital artists, commissioning generative works that are later created by craftspeople from regions such as Morocco, Italy, and France.

Trame produces limited-edition collections of furniture, textiles, and home decor. Each piece is created through a collaborative process involving digital algorithms and manual craft.

== Projects ==
In 2024, Trame presented a large-scale installation during Art Blocks Marfa Weekend in Texas. The project included a Berber-style camp and a series of generative tapestries designed by artists IX Shells, Linda Dounia, and Fingacode, developed from a research trip to Morocco in 2023.

Trame's work has been featured in international design events including Milan Design Week and the International Contemporary Furniture Fair (ICFF).
