= Responsive computer-aided design =

Approach to computer-aided design

Responsive computer-aided design (also simplified to responsive design) is an approach to computer-aided design (CAD) that utilizes real-world sensors and data to modify a three-dimensional (3D) computer model. The concept is related to cyber-physical systems through blurring of the virtual and physical worlds, however, applies specifically to the initial digital design of an object prior to production.

The process begins with a designer creating a basic design of an object using CAD software with parametric or algorithmic relationships. These relationships are then linked to physical sensors, allowing them to drive changes to the CAD model within the established parameters. Reasons to allow sensors to modify a CAD model include customizing a design to fit a user's anthropometry, assisting people without CAD skills to personalize a design, or automating part of an iterative design process in similar fashion to generative design. Once the sensors have affected the design it may then be manufactured as a one-off piece using a digital fabrication technology, or go through further development by a designer.

== Context ==
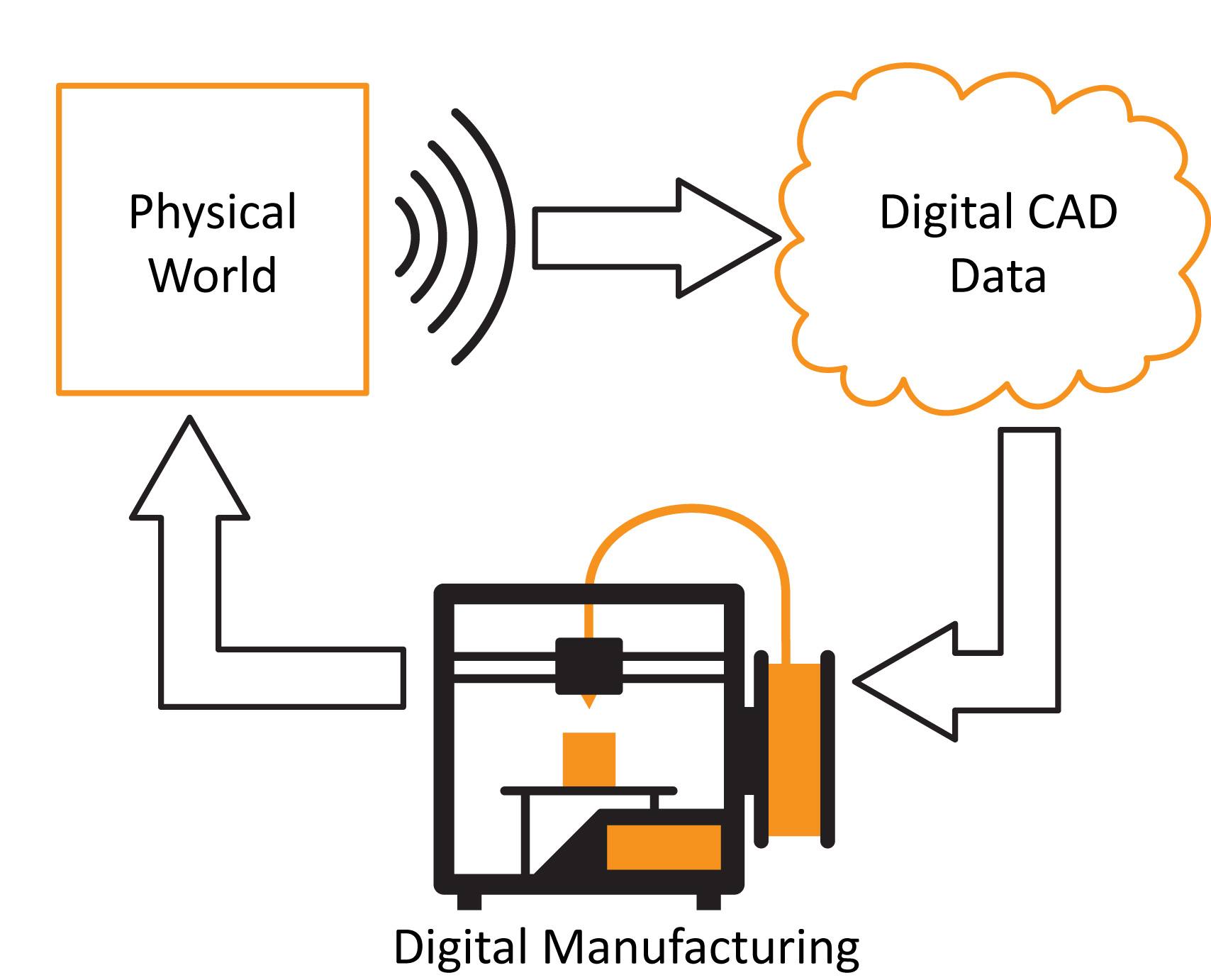
Diagram describing the process of physical sensing, CAD customization and digital fabrication in responsive computer-aided design. This may be cyclical.

Responsive computer-aided design is enabled by ubiquitous computing and the Internet of Things, concepts which describe the capacity for everyday objects to contain computing and sensing technologies. It is also enabled by the ability to directly manufacture one-off objects from digital data, using technologies such as 3D printing and computer numerical control (CNC) machines. Such digital fabrication technologies allow for customization, and are drivers of the mass-customization phenomenon. They also provide new opportunities for consumers to participate in the design process, known as co-design.

As these concepts mature, responsive design is emerging as an opportunity to reduce reliance on graphical user interfaces (GUIs) as the only method for designers and consumers to design products, aligning with claims by Golden Krishna that "the best design reduces work. The best computer is unseen. The best interaction is natural. The best interface is no interface." Calls to reduce reliance on GUIs and automate some of the design process connects with Mark Weiser's original vision of ubiquitous computing.

== Related concepts ==
A variety of similar research areas are based on gesture recognition, with many projects using motion capture to track the physical motions of a designer and translate them into three-dimensional geometry suitable for digital fabrication. While these share similarities to responsive design through their cyber-physical systems, they require direct intent to design an object and some level of skill. These are not considered responsive, as responsive design occurs autonomously and may even occur without the user being aware that they are designing at all.

This topic has some common traits with responsive web design and responsive architecture, with both fields focused on systems design and adaptation based on functional conditions.

== Current work ==
Responsive computer-aided design has been used to customize fashion, and is currently an active area of research in footwear by large companies like New Balance who are looking to customize shoe midsoles using foot pressure data from customers.

Sound waves have also been popular to customize 3D models and produce sculptural forms of a baby's first cries, or a favorite song.

== See also ==
- Design computing
- Four-dimensional product
- Industry 4.0
- Product design
