= Requena =

Requena may refer to:

== Places ==
=== Peru ===
- Requena, Loreto, capital of Requena Province, Peru
- Requena Province, Peru

=== Spain ===
- Requena, Valencia, a town in the Valencian Community
- Requena de Campos, a municipality located in the province of Palencia, Castile and León
- Utiel-Requena, a wine-producing region in the Valencian Community

== People with the surname ==
- Cecilia Requena (born 1967), Bolivian politician
- Dani Requena (born 2004), Spanish footballer
- Daniela Requena (born 1992), Spanish writer, journalist, social media influencer, and activist for the rights of transgender people
- Eleonora Requena (born 1968), Venezuelan poet
- Gladys Requena (born 1952), Venezuelan politician
- Gonzalo Requena (born 2003), Argentine footballer
- Guto Requena (born 1979), Brazilian architect and designer
- Jonathan Requena (born 1996), Argentine footballer
- José García Requena (1955–2014), Spanish tennis player
- Juan Requena (born 1999), Argentine footballer
- Juan Diego Requena (born 1980), Spanish politician
- Júlio Requena, Spanish Paralympic athlete
- Leandro Requena (born 1987), Argentine footballer
- Manuel Requena (1802–1876), president of the Los Angeles Common Council in the early 1850s
- Osvaldo Requena (1931–2010), Argentine tango pianist, arranger, and composer
- Pedro Requena (footballer, born 1961), Peruvian football centre-back
- Pedro Requena (footballer, born 1991), Peruvian football right-back
- Vincente Requena the Elder, Spanish painter of the 16th century
- Yurema Requena (born 1983), Spanish swimmer who competed in the 2008 Summer Olympics
