= 4D printing =

3D printing that changes shape according to certain stimuli

4-dimensional printing (4D printing; also known as 4D bioprinting, active origami, or shape-morphing systems) uses the same techniques of 3D printing through computer-programmed deposition of material in successive layers to create a three-dimensional object. However, in 4D printing, the resulting 3D shape is able to morph into different forms in response to environmental stimulus, with the 4th dimension being the time-dependent shape change after the printing. It is therefore a type of programmable matter, wherein after the fabrication process, the printed product reacts with parameters within the environment (humidity, temperature, voltage, etc.) and changes its form accordingly.

== Printing techniques ==
Stereolithography is a 3D-printing technique that uses photopolymerization to bind substrate that has been laid layer upon layer, creating a polymeric network. As opposed to fused-deposition modeling, where the extruded material hardens immediately to form layers, 4D printing is fundamentally based in stereolithography, where in most cases ultraviolet light is used to cure the layered materials after the printing process has completed. Anisotropy is vital in engineering the direction and magnitude of transformations under a given condition, by arranging the micromaterials in a way so that there is an embedded directionality to the finished print.

=== Fiber architecture ===
One of the composite polymers that Tibbits et al. printed, reacting when submerged underwater.

Most 4D printing systems utilize a network of fibers that vary in size and material properties. 4D-printed components can be designed on the macro scale as well as the micro scale. Micro scale design is achieved through complex molecular/fiber simulations that approximate the aggregated material properties of all the materials used in the sample. The size, shape, modulus, and connection pattern of these material building blocks have a direct relationship to the deformation shape under stimulus activation.

==== Hydro-reactive polymers/hydro gels ====
Skylar Tibbits is the director of the Self-Assembly Lab at MIT, and worked with the Stratasys Materials Group to produce a composite polymer composed of highly hydrophilic elements and non-active, highly rigid elements. The unique properties of these two disparate elements allowed up to 150% swelling of certain parts of the printed chain in water, while the rigid elements set structure and angle constraints for the transformed chain. They produced a chain that would spell "MIT" when submerged in water, and another chain that would morph into a wire frame cube when subjected to the same conditions.

===== Hygromnemic versus hygromorphic actuation =====
Hygromnemic actuation is a humidity-triggered actuation technique inspired by the humidity-responsive shape-memory behavior of polymers. In this approach, actuators employ a pre-constraining method to store shapes that can later be recovered upon exposure to environmental humidity.

Materials that are highly sensitive to moisture have been used to enable 4D-printed actuation, making them particularly suitable for hygromnemic systems. During actuation, the mechanism can be selectively blocked: out-of-plane deformation may be arrested while in-plane deformation continues. This selective constraint enables the actuator to store intermediate actuated shapes, effectively expanding the range of possible deformation modes.

Hygromorphic actuators respond to humidity changes through the differential expansion of layers. This differential expansion can be achieved either by combining different materials in separate layers or by varying the printing orientation of a single material. Compared to hygromorphic actuation, hygromnemic actuation offers an increased design space for programmable material transformations, allowing more complex and versatile motion pathways.

===== Cellulose composites =====
Thiele et al. explored the possibilities of a cellulose-based material that could be responsive to low-humidity. They developed a bilayer film using cellulose stearoyl esters with different substitution degrees on either side. One ester had a substitution degree of 0.3 (highly hydrophilic) and the other had a substitution degree of 3 (highly hydrophobic.) When the sample was cooled from 50 °C to 22 °C, and the relative humidity increased from 5.9% to 35%, the hydrophobic side contracted and the hydrophilic side swelled, causing the sample to roll up tightly. This process is reversible, as reverting the temperature and humidity changes caused the sample to unroll again.

Understanding anisotropic swelling and mapping the alignment of printed fibrils allowed A. Sydney Gladman et al. to mimic the nastic behavior of plants. Branches, stems, bracts, and flowers respond to environmental stimuli such as humidity, light, and touch by varying the internal turgor of their cell walls and tissue composition. Taking precedent from this, the team developed a composite hydrogel architecture with local anisotropic swelling behavior that mimics the structure of a typical cell wall. Cellulose fibrils combine during the printing process into microfibrils with a high aspect ratio (~100) and an elastic modulus on the scale of 100 GPa. These microfibrils are embedded into a soft acrylamide matrix for structure.

The viscoelastic ink used to print this hydrogel composite is an aqueous solution of N,N-dimethylacrylamide, nanoclay, glucose oxidase, glucose, and nanofibrillated cellulose. The nanoclay is a rheological aid that improves liquid flow, and the glucose prevents oxygen inhibition when the material is cured with ultraviolet light. Experimenting with this ink, the team created a theoretical model for a print path that dictates the orientation of cellulose fibrils, where the bottom layer of the print is parallel to the x-axis and the top layer of the print is rotated anticlockwise by an angle θ. The curvature of the sample is dependent on elastic moduli, swelling ratios, and ratios of layer thickness and bilayer thickness. Thus, the adjusted models that describe mean curvature and Gaussian curvature are, respectively,

$H = c_1 \frac {\alpha_\parallel - \alpha_\perp}{h} \frac {\sin^2(\theta)}{c_2 -c_3\cos(2\theta) + m_4\cos(4\theta)}$

and

$K = -c_4 \frac {(\alpha_\parallel - \alpha_\perp)^{2}}{h^{2}} \frac {\sin^2(\theta)}{c_5 -c_6\cos(2\theta) + m_4\cos(4\theta)}$

Gladman et al. found that as θ approaches 0°, the curvature approximates the classical Timoshenko equation and performs similarly to a bimetallic strip. But as θ approaches 90°, the curvature transforms into a saddle shape. Understanding this, then, the team could carefully control the effects of anisotropy and break lines of symmetry to create helicoids, ruffled profiles, and more.

==== Thermo-reactive polymers/hydrogels ====
Poly(N-isopropylacrylamide), or pNIPAM, is a commonly used thermo-responsive material. A hydrogel of pNIPAM becomes hydrophilic and swollen in an aqueous solution of 32 °C, its low critical solution temperature. Temperatures above that start to dehydrate the hydrogel and cause it shrink, thus achieving shape transformation. Hydrogels composed of pNIPAM and some other polymer, such as 4-hydroxybutyl acrylate (4HBA,) exhibit strong reversibility, where even after 10 cycles of shape change there is no shape deformation. Shannon E. Bakarich et al. created a new type of 4D-printing ink composed of ionic covalent entanglement hydrogels that have a similar structure to standard double-network hydrogels. The first polymer network is cross-linked with metal cations, while the second is cross-linked with covalent bonds. This hydrogel is then paired with a pNIPAM network for toughening and thermal actuation. In lab testing, this gel showed a shape recovery of 41%-49% when the temperature increased 20–60 °C (68–140 °F), and then was restored to 20 °C. A fluid controlling smart valve printed from this material was designed to close when touching hot water and open when touching cold water. The valve successfully stayed open in cold water and reduced the flow rate of hot water by 99%. This new type of 4D-printed hydrogel is more mechanically robust than other thermally actuating hydrogels and shows potential in applications such as self-assembling structures, medical technology, soft robotics, and sensor technology.

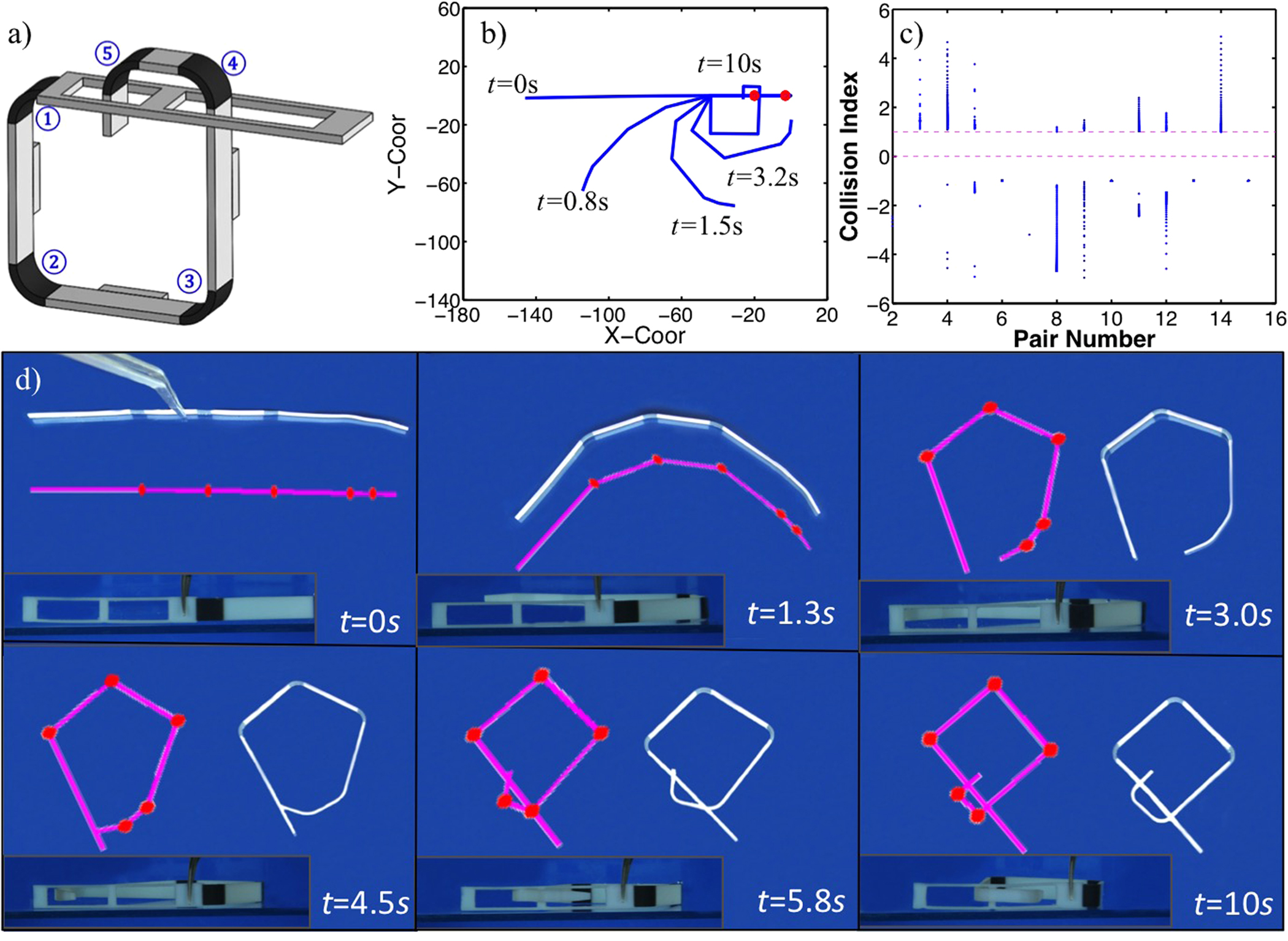
A schematic of an interlocking SMP component.

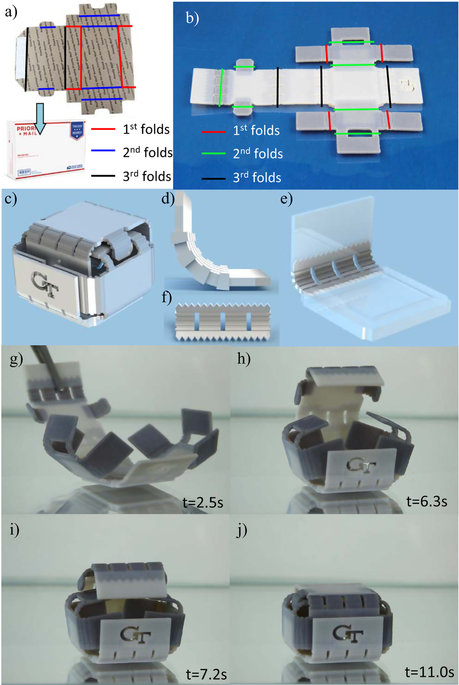
An interlocking and self-folding SMP mimicking the folding procedure of a USPS mailbox.

=== Digital shape-memory polymers ===
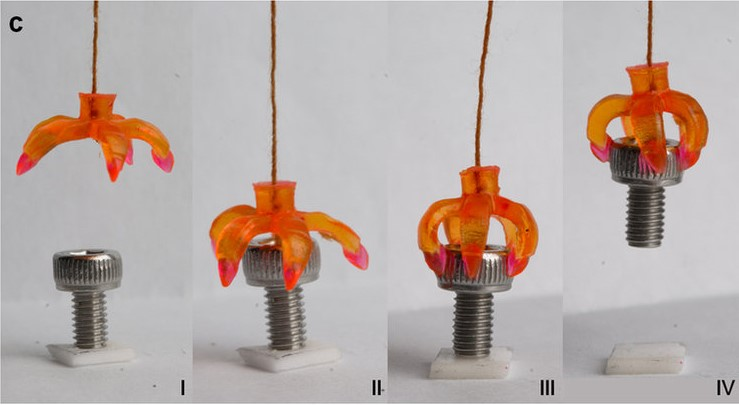
A time-lapse of an SMP gripper that Qi Ge et al. developed for grabbing and releasing an object.

Shape-memory polymers (SMPs) are able to recover their original shape from a deformed shape under certain circumstances, such as when exposed to a temperature for a period of time. Depending on the polymer, there may be a variety of configurations that the material may take in a number of temperature conditions. Digital SMPs utilize 3D-printing technology to precisely engineer the placement, geometry, and mixing and curing ratios of SMPs with differing properties, such as glass transition or crystal-melt transition temperatures. Yiqi Mao et al. used this to create a series of digital SMP hinges that have differing prescribed thermo-mechanical and shape memory behaviors, which are grafted onto rigid, non-active materials. Thus, the team was able to develop a self-folding sample that could fold without interfering with itself, and even interlock to create a more robust structure. One of the projects include a self-folding box modeled after a USPS mailbox.

Qi Ge et al. designed digital SMPs based on constituents with varying rubbery moduli and glass-transition temperatures with extremely high-failure strains of up to 300% larger than existing printable materials. This allowed them to create a multi-material gripper that could grab and release an object according to a temperature input. The thick joints were made of SMPs for robustness, while the tips of the microgrippers could be designed separately to accommodate a safe contact for the object of transport.

=== Stress relaxation ===
Stress relaxation in 4D printing is a process in which a material assembly is created under stress that becomes "stored" within the material. This stress can later be released, causing an overall material shape change.

==== Thermal photo-reactive polymers ====
This type of polymeric actuation can be described as photo-induced stress relaxation.

This technology takes advantage of temperature driven polymer bending by exposing the desired bending seams to focused strips of intense light. These bending seams are printed in a state of stress but do not deform until exposed to light. The active agent that induces bending in the material is heat transmitted by intense light. The material itself is made of chemical photo-reactive polymers. These compounds use a polymer mixture combined with a photoinitiator to create an amorphous, covalent cross-linked polymer. This material is formed into sheets and loaded in tension perpendicular to the desired bending crease.

The material is then exposed to a specific wavelength of light, as the photoinitiator is consumed it polymerizes the remaining mixture, inducing photo initiated stress relaxation. The portion of material exposed to the light can be controlled with stencils to create specific bending patterns. It is also possible to run multiple iterations of this process using the same material sample with different loading conditions or stencil masks for each iteration. The final form will depend on the order and resulting form of each iteration.

=== Origin of the Actuation ===
The concepts of Fibre-Dominated Actuation and Matrix-Dominated Actuation were developed to describe the mechanisms underlying motion in fibre composite material actuators.

Fibre-Dominated Actuation refers to a mode of 4D printing actuation in which deformation primarily originates from the embedded fibres within the composite material. For example, composites containing discontinuous wood fibres embedded in a polymer matrix exhibit such behaviour. In these systems, many polymers display minimal sensitivity to changes in humidity, resulting in a relatively stable matrix. However, the wood fibres are highly moisture-absorbent and expand upon exposure to humidity. This expansion of the fibres acts as the primary trigger for the 4D-printed structure's actuation, thereby driving the overall shape transformation.

In contrast, Matrix-Dominated Actuation occurs when the principal source of deformation arises from the matrix itself rather than the fibres. An example of this behaviour can be observed in composite materials consisting of short flax fibres reinforced within a hydrogel matrix. In such systems, the hydrogel is highly responsive to drying or hydration, leading to significant volumetric deformation. The short flax fibres serve mainly to constrain deformation along the printing direction, but due to their limited length and embedded configuration, their contribution to the actuation process is negligible. Consequently, the overall motion of the actuator is primarily governed by the matrix's response to environmental conditions.

== Current applications ==
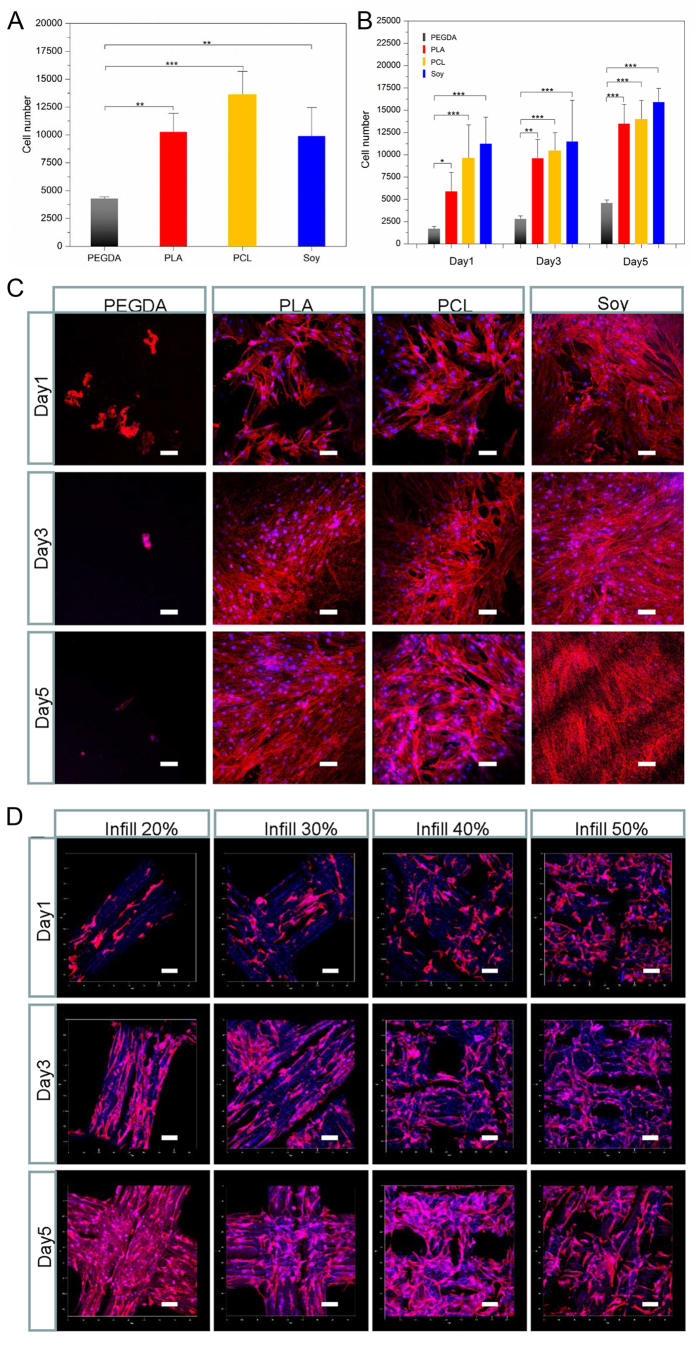
Miao et al. Parts A, B, and C indicate cell growth on the soy scaffold compared to different materials. Part D indicates cell growth on differing infill densities within the soy scaffold.

=== Advances in Biomedical Applications ===
Dr. Lijie Grace Zhang's research team at the George Washington University created a new type of 4D-printable, photo-curable liquid resin. This resin is made of a renewable soybean-oil epoxidized acrylate compound that is also biocompatible. This resin adds to the small group of 3D-printable resins and is one of the few that are biocompatible. A laser 3D-printed sample of this resin was subjected to temperature fluctuations from −18 °C to 37 °C and exhibited full recovery of its original shape. Printed scaffolds of this material proved to be successful foundations for human bone marrow mesenchymal stem cell (hMSCs) growth. This material's strong qualities of shape memory effect and biocompatibility lead researchers to believe that it will strongly advance the development of biomedical scaffolds. This research article is one of the first that explore the use of plant oil polymers as liquid resins for stereolithography production in biomedical applications.

Research team of Leonid Ionov (University of Bayreuth) has developed novel approach to print shape-morphing biocompatible/biodegradable hydrogels with living cells. The approach allows fabrication of hollow self-folding tubes with unprecedented control over their diameters and architectures at high resolution. The versatility of the approach is demonstrated by employing two different bio polymers (alginate and hyaluronic acid) and mouse bone marrow stromal cells. Harnessing the printing and post-printing parameters allows attaining average internal tube diameters as low as 20 μm, which is not yet achievable by other existing bio printing approaches and is comparable to the diameters of the smallest blood vessels. The proposed 4D bioprinting process does not pose any negative effect on the viability of the printed cells, and the self-folded hydrogel-based tubes support cell survival for at least 7 days without any decrease in cell viability. Consequently, the presented 4D bioprinting strategy allows the fabrication of dynamically reconfigurable architectures with tunable functionality and responsiveness, governed by the selection of suitable materials and cells.

== Possible applications ==
There are some existing techniques/technologies that could potentially be applied and adjusted for 4D printing.

=== Cell traction force ===
Cell traction force (CTF) is a technique wherein living cells fold and move microstructures into their designed shape. This is possible through the contraction that occurs from actin polymerization and actomyosin interactions within the cell. In natural processes, CTF regulates wound healing, angiogenesis, metastasis, and inflammation. Takeuchi et al. seeded cells across two microplates, and when the glass structure was removed the cells would bridge the gap across the microplate and thus initiate self-folding. The team was able to create vessel-like geometries and even high throughput dodecahedrons with this method. There is speculation that utilizing this technique of cell origami will lead to designing and printing a cell-laden structure that can mimic their non-synthetic counterparts after the printing process has completed.

=== Electrical and magnetic smart materials ===
The electrical responsive materials that exist today change their size and shape depending on the intensity and/or direction of an external electric field or applied electrical current. Polyaniline and polypyrrole (PPy) are, in particular, good conducting materials and can be doped with tetrafluoroborate to contract and expand under an electric stimulus. A robot made of these materials was made to move using an electric pulse of 3V for 5 seconds, causing one leg to extend, then removing the stimulus for 10 seconds, causing the other leg to move forward. Research on carbon nanotubes, which are biocompatible and highly conductive, indicates that a composite made of carbon nanotube and a shape memory specimen has a higher electrical conductivity and speed of electro-active response than either specimen alone.

Shape memory composite structures incorporating highly conductive metallic surface layers have also been demonstrated to be highly electrical responsive. Due to its high electrical conductivity enabled by an electroless plated metal surface, these composites may be used in electrical devices for temperature sensing (if using a temperature-responsive shape memory polymer matrix), or as electrical safety devices. B.Q.Y. Chan et al. fabricated a multiple-temperature sensing device with various switches triggered at different temperatures. The incorporation of the metallic coating was demonstrated to have no adverse impact on the shape memory performance of the switches.

Magnetically responsive ferrogels contract in the presence of a strong magnetic field and thus have applications in drug and cell delivery. The combination of carbon nanotubes and magnetically responsive particles has been bioprinted for use in promoting cell growth and adhesion, while still maintaining a strong conductivity.

=== Commerce and transportation ===
Skylar Tibbits elaborates on future applications of 4D-printed materials as programmable products that can be tailored to specific environments and respond to factors such as the temperature, humidity, pressure, and sound of one's body or environment. Tibbits also mentions the advantage of 4D-printing for shipping applications - it will allow products to be packaged flat to later have their designed shape activated on site by a simple stimulus. There is also the possibility of 4D-printed shipping containers that react to forces in transit to uniformly distribute loads. Some 4D-printed materials might be able to repair themselves after failure, or self-disassemble for easier recycling.

== See also ==
- Four-dimensional product
- Responsive architecture
