= Skylar Tibbits =

American architect

- Education: Philadelphia University; Massachusetts Institute of Technology
- Occupations: Researcher and scientist

Skylar Tibbits is an American designer and computer scientist known for his work on self-assembly and 4D printing.

== Education ==
Skylar Tibbits graduated from Philadelphia University with a Bachelor of Architecture and received a Master of Science in Computer Science as well as a Master of Science in Design and Computation from MIT.

== Career ==
Tibbits' work has been exhibited at the Solomon R. Guggenheim Museum in New York, the Frac Center's 2014 Archilab Exhibition, and the 2008 Beijing Biennale. Tibbits also co-curated the 2007 ScriptedbyPurpose exhibition in Philadelphia with Marc Fornes.

He currently teaches at the Massachusetts Institute of Technology, Department of Architecture where he has founded the Self-Assembly Laboratory. Tibbits is also the founder of SJET, a cross-disciplinary design firm in Boston.

== Awards ==
Tibbits's work has won awards, including a 2014 WIRED Inaugural Fellowship, 2014 Gifted Citizen Initiative, the 2013 Architectural League NYC Prize, the 2013 Next Idea in Art and Technology Award at Ars Electronica, 2012 TED Senior Fellowship, 2011 TED Fellowship and being named a "Revolutionary Mind" in Seed's 2008 Design Issue.
