= Digital modeling and fabrication =

Design and production process

Digital modeling and fabrication is a design and production process that combines 3D modeling or computing-aided design (CAD) with additive and subtractive manufacturing. Additive manufacturing is also known as 3D printing, while subtractive manufacturing may also be referred to as machining, and many other technologies can be used to physically produce the designed objects.

== Modeling ==
Digitally fabricated objects are created with a variety of CAD software packages, using both 2D vector drawing, and 3D modeling. Types of 3D models include wireframe, solid, surface and mesh. A design has one or more of these model types.

== Machines for fabrication ==
Three machines are popular for fabrication:

1. CNC router

2. Laser cutter

3. 3D Printer

=== CNC milling machine ===
CNC stands for "computer numerical control". CNC mills or routers include proprietary software which interprets 2D vector drawings or 3D models and converts this information to a G-code, which represents specific CNC functions in an alphanumeric format, which the CNC mill can interpret. The G-codes drive a machine tool, a powered mechanical device typically used to fabricate components. CNC machines are classified according to the number of axes that they possess, with 3, 4 and 5 axis machines all being common, and industrial robots being described with having as many as 9 axes. CNC machines are specifically successful in milling materials such as plywood, plastics, foam board, and metal at a fast speed. CNC machine beds are typically large enough to allow 4' × 8' (123 cm x 246 cm) sheets of material, including foam several inches thick, to be cut.

=== Laser cutter ===
The laser cutter is a machine that uses a laser to cut materials such as chip board, matte board, felt, wood, and acrylic up to 3/8 inch (1 cm) thickness. The laser cutter is often bundled with a driver software which interprets vector drawings produced by any number of CAD software platforms.

The laser cutter is able to modulate the speed of the laser head, as well as the intensity and resolution of the laser beam, and as such is able both to cut and to score material, as well as approximate raster graphics.

Objects cut out of materials can be used in the fabrication of physical models, which will only require the assembly of the flat parts.

=== 3D printers ===
3D printers use a variety of methods and technology to assemble physical versions of digital objects. Typically desktop 3D printers can make small plastic 3D objects. They use a roll of thin plastic filament, melting the plastic and then depositing it precisely to cool and harden. They normally build 3D objects from bottom to top in a series of many very thin plastic horizontal layers. This process often happens over the course of several hours.

==== Fused deposition modeling ====
Fused deposition modeling, also known as fused filament fabrication, uses a 3-axis robotic system that extrudes material, typically a thermoplastic, one thin layer at a time and progressively builds up a shape. Examples of machines that use this method are the Dimension 768 and the Ultimaker.

==== Stereolithography ====
Stereolithography uses a high intensity light projector, usually using DLP technology, with a photosensitive polymer resin. It will project the profile of an object to build a single layer, curing the resin into a solid shape. Then the printer will move the object out of the way by a small amount and project the profile of the next layer. Examples of devices that use this method are the Form-One printer and Os-RC Illios.

==== Selective laser sintering ====
Selective laser sintering uses a laser to trace out the shape of an object in a bed of finely powdered material that can be fused together by the application of heat from the laser. After one layer has been traced by a laser, the bed and partially finished part is moved out of the way, a thin layer of the powdered material is spread, and the process is repeated. Typical materials used are alumide, steel, glass, thermoplastics (especially nylon), and certain ceramics. Example devices include the Formiga P 110 and the Eos EosINT P730.

==== Powder printer ====
Powder printer work in a similar manner to SLS machines, and typically use powders that can be cured, hardened, or otherwise made solid by the application of a liquid binder that is delivered via an inkjet printhead. Common materials are plaster of paris, clay, powdered sugar, wood-filler bonding putty, and flour, which are typically cured with water, alcohol, vinegar, or some combination thereof. The major advantage of powder and SLS machines is their ability to continuously support all parts of their objects throughout the printing process with unprinted powder. This permits the production of geometries not easily otherwise created. However, these printers are often more complex and expensive. Examples of printers using this method are the ZCorp Zprint 400 and 450.

== See also ==
- Direct digital manufacturing
- Industry 4.0
- Rapid Prototyping
- Responsive computer-aided design
- Technology education
