= Smart wearable system =

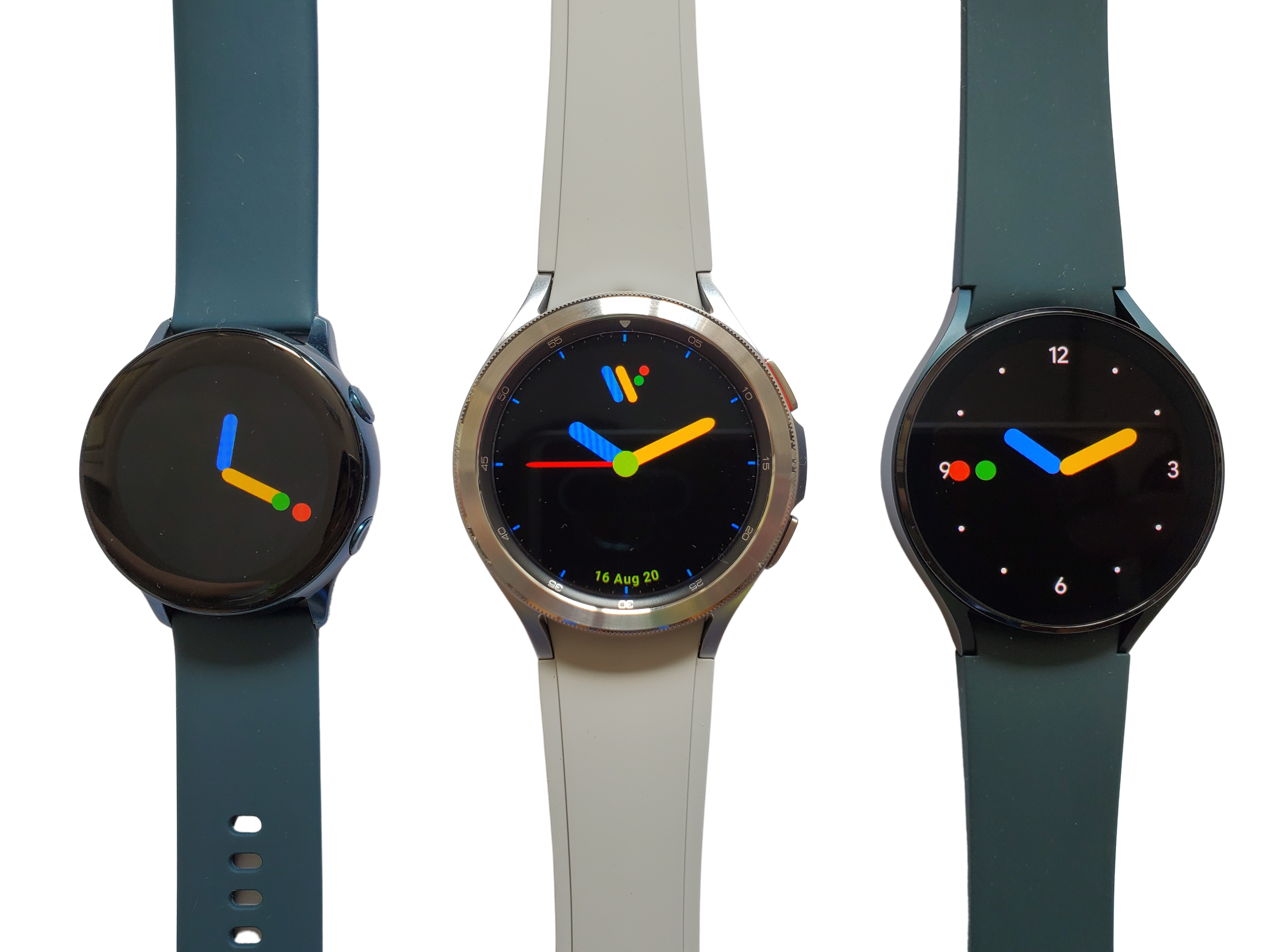
Samsung Galaxy smart watches

A smart wearable system (SWS) is an end-to-end integrated and connected system that has the following features:

- one or more sensors and actuators nodes at the end-user side and possibly integrated into worn items
- nodes connectivity to local and/or remote processor
- processor that classifies events and, when actuators are available, takes corrective action

Sensor nodes can monitor a.o. body location, motion & posture, body vital signs and local context. Actuator nodes can influence properties of the worn items, e.g. in order to protect the wearer from risks, or provide wearer with feedback/recommendations.

The concept of SWS can be seen as an extension and integration of the wearable electronics (wearable computers) and intelligent textiles concepts (e-textiles) from isolated to fully (web) connected systems thus enabling provision of a new category of products.

Examples of SWS application categories can be active safety, risks prevention, coaching, performance improvements, entertainment. For instance e.g. supervised continuous remote monitoring/co-ordination of workers exposed to specific risks, soldiers on the field, people with chronic cardiac diseases or e.g. fitness coach systems where assessment of fitness level as well feedback and improvement recommendations based on deviations from training plans are provided during or after the activity.

SWS applications are emerging a.o. in the sport, entertainment, healthcare, military domains.

The term Smart Wearable Systems has been referenced a.o. by the following authors (sorted, most recent first):

- Smart Wearable systems: vision and challenges. Giuseppe Coppola, Munich, Germany

- New Generation of Smart Wearable Health Systems and Applications, IEEE TRANSACTIONS ON INFORMATION TECHNOLOGY IN BIOMEDICINE, VOL. 9, NO. 3, SEPTEMBER 2005, pg 293

- Smart wearable systems for personalised health management: current R&D and future challenges, Lymberis, A., Engineering in Medicine and Biology Society, 2003. Proceedings of the 25th Annual International Conference of the IEEE, 17-21 Sept. 2003, Volume: 4, pg 3716- 3719

== See also ==
- Wearable technology
