= Generative design =

Iterative design process

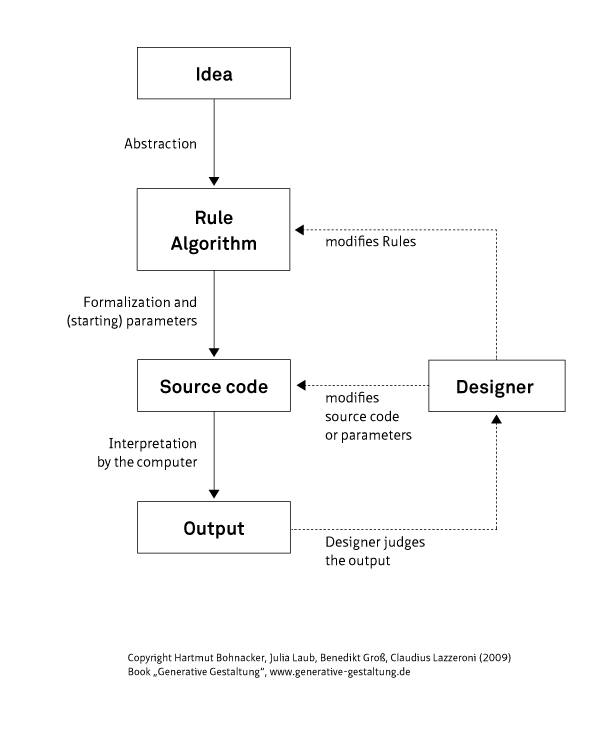
Schema of generative design as an iterative process

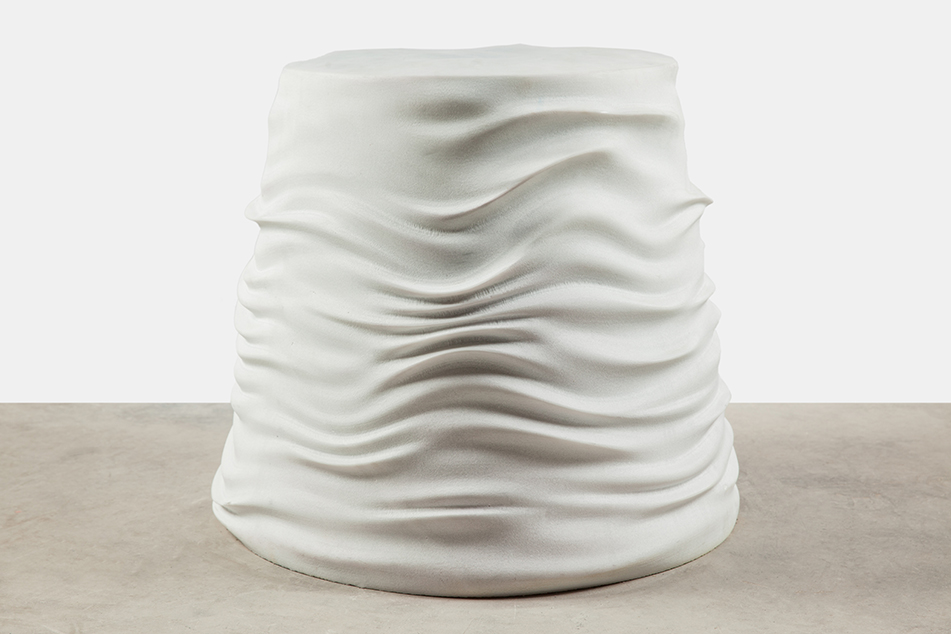
Samba, a piece of furniture created by Guto Requena with generative design

Generative design is an iterative design process that uses software to generate outputs that fulfill a set of constraints iteratively adjusted by a designer. Whether a human, test program, or artificial intelligence, the designer algorithmically or manually refines the feasible region of the program's inputs and outputs with each iteration to fulfill evolving design requirements. By employing computing power to evaluate more design permutations than a human alone is capable of, the process is capable of producing an optimal design that mimics nature's evolutionary approach to design through genetic variation and selection. The output can be images, sounds, architectural models, animation, and much more. It is, therefore, a fast method of exploring design possibilities that is used in various design fields such as art, architecture, communication design, and product design.

Generative design has become more important, largely due to new programming environments or scripting capabilities that have made it relatively easy, even for designers with little programming experience, to implement their ideas. Additionally, this process can create solutions to substantially complex problems that would otherwise be resource-exhaustive with an alternative approach, making it a more attractive option for problems with a large or unknown solution set. It is also facilitated with tools in commercially available CAD packages. Not only are implementation tools more accessible, but also tools leveraging generative design as a foundation.

Recent advancements have led to the development of Deep Generative Design, a framework that integrates topology optimization with deep learning models, such as Generative Adversarial Networks (GANs). Unlike traditional evolutionary methods that primarily focus on engineering performance, this approach uses deep generative models to enhance aesthetic diversity and novelty while simultaneously satisfying engineering constraints. For instance, research by Oh et al. (2019) proposed a framework using Boundary Equilibrium GANs (BEGAN) to generate diverse design options which are then refined through density-based topology optimization, allowing for the exploration of complex design spaces that balance structural integrity with visual variation.

In practice, generative design does not solely aim to produce a single optimal solution, but involves iteratively refining the design problem by modifying parameters, constraints, and evaluation criteria within a computational model, resulting in multiple design alternatives from which the designer selects.

== Use in architecture ==
Generative design in architecture is an iterative design process that enables architects to explore a wider solution space with more possibility and creativity. Architectural design has long been regarded as a wicked problem. Compared with traditional top-down design approach, generative design can address design problems efficiently, by using a bottom-up paradigm that uses parametric-defined rules to generate complex solutions. The solution itself then evolves to a good, if not optimal, solution. The advantage of using generative design as a design tool is that it does not construct fixed geometries, but take a set of design rules that can generate an infinite set of possible design solutions. The generated design solutions can be more sensitive, responsive, and adaptive to the problem.

Generative design involves rule definition and result analysis that are integrated with the design process. By defining parameters and rules, the generative approach is able to provide optimized solution for both structural stability and aesthetics. Possible design algorithms include cellular automata, shape grammar, genetic algorithm, space syntax, and most recently, artificial neural network. Due to the high complexity of the solution generated, rule-based computational tools, such as finite element method and topology optimisation, are preferred to evaluate and optimise the generated solution. The iterative process provided by computer software enables the trial-and-error approach in design, and involves architects interfering with the optimisation process.

Historically precedent work includes Antoni Gaudí's Sagrada Família, which used rule based geometrical forms for structures, and Buckminster Fuller's Montreal Biosphere where the rules were designed to generate individual components, rather than the final product.

More recent generative-design cases include Foster and Partners' Queen Elizabeth II Great Court, where the tessellated glass roof was designed using a geometric schema to define hierarchical relationships, and then the generated solution was optimized based on geometrical and structural requirements.

== Use in sustainable design ==
Generative design in sustainable design is an effective approach addressing energy efficiency and climate change at the early design stage, recognizing buildings contribute to approximately one-third of global greenhouse gas emissions and 30%-40% of total building energy use. It integrates environmental principles with algorithms, enabling exploration of countless design alternatives to enhance energy performance, reduce carbon footprints, and minimize waste.

A key feature of generative design in sustainable design is its ability to incorporate Building Performance Simulations (BPS) into the design process. Simulation programs such as EnergyPlus, Ladybug Tools,, and so on, combined with generative algorithms, can optimize design solutions for cost-effective energy use and zero-carbon building designs. For example, the GENE_ARCH system used a Pareto algorithm with building energy simulation for the whole building design optimization. Generative design has improved sustainable facade design, as illustrated by the algorithm of cellular automata and daylight simulations in adaptive facade design. In addition, genetic algorithms were used with radiation simulations for energy-efficient photo-voltaic (PV) modules on high-rise building facades. Generative design is also applied to life cycle analysis (LCA), as demonstrated by a framework using grid search algorithms to optimize exterior wall design for minimum environmental impact.

Multi-objective optimization embraces multiple diverse sustainability goals, such as interactive kinetic louvers using biomimicry and daylight simulations to enhance daylight, visual comfort, and energy efficiency. The study of PV and shading systems can maximize on-site electricity, improve visual quality, and daylight performance.

Artificial intelligence (AI) and machine learning (ML) further improve computation efficiency in complex climate-responsive sustainable design. One study employed reinforcement learning to identify the relationship between design parameters and energy use for a sustainable campus, while other studies tried hybrid algorithms, such as using the genetic algorithm and GANs to balance daylight illumination and thermal comfort under different roof conditions. Other popular AI tools were also integrated, including deep reinforcement learning (DRL) and computer vision (CV), to generate an urban block according to direct sunlight hours and solar heat gains. These AI-driven generative design methods enable faster simulations and design decision making, resulting in designs that are environmentally responsible.

== Use in additive manufacturing ==
Additive manufacturing (AM) is a process that creates physical models directly from three-dimensional (3D) data by joining materials layer by layer. It is used in industries to produce a variety of end-use parts, which are final components designed for direct application in products or systems. AM provides design flexibility and enables material reduction in lightweight applications, such as aerospace, automotive, medical, and portable electronic devices, where minimizing weight is critical for performance. Generative design, one of the four key methods for lightweight design in AM, is commonly applied to optimize structures for specific performance requirements.

Generative design can help create optimized solutions that balance multiple objectives, such as enhancing performance while minimizing cost. In design for additive manufacturing (DfAM), multi-objective topology optimization is used to generate a set of candidate solutions. Designers then assess these options using their expertise and key performance indicators (KPIs) to select the best option for implementation.

However, integrating AM constraints (e.g., speed of build, materials, build envelope, and accuracy) into generative design remains challenging, as ensuring all solutions are valid is complex. Balancing multiple design objectives while limiting computational costs adds further challenges for designers. To overcome these difficulties, researchers proposed a generative design method with manufacturing validation to improve decision-making efficiency. This method starts with a constructive solid geometry (CSG)-based technique to create smooth topology shapes with precise geometric control. Then, a genetic algorithm is used to optimize these shapes, and the method offers designers a set of top non-dominated solutions on the Pareto frontier for further evaluation and final decision-making. By combining multiple techniques, this method can generate many high-quality solutions with smooth boundaries at lower computational costs, making it a practical approach for designing lightweight structures in AM.

Building on topology optimization methods, software providers introduced generative design features in their tools, helping designers set criteria and rank solutions. Industry is driving advancements in generative design for AM, highlighting the need for tools that not only offer a range of solutions but also streamline workflows for industrial use.

== See also ==
- Computer art
- Computer-automated design
- Feedback
- Generative art
- Parametric design
- Procedural modeling
- Random number generation
- System dynamics
- Topology optimization
