= Responsive architecture =

Responsive architecture is an evolving field of architectural practice and research. Responsive architectures are those that measure actual environmental conditions (via sensors) to enable buildings to adapt their form, shape, color or character responsively (via actuators).

Responsive architectures aim to refine and extend the discipline of architecture by improving the energy performance of buildings with responsive technologies (sensors / control systems / actuators) while also producing buildings that reflect the technological and cultural conditions of our time.

Responsive architectures distinguish themselves from other forms of interactive design by incorporating intelligent and responsive technologies into the core elements of a building's fabric. For example: by incorporating responsive technologies into the structural systems of buildings architects have the ability to tie the shape of a building directly to its environment. This enables architects to reconsider the way they design and construct space while striving to advance the discipline rather than applying patchworks of intelligent technologies to an existing vision of "building".

== History ==
The common definition of responsive architecture, as described by many authors, is a class of architecture or building that demonstrates an ability to alter its form, to continually reflect the environmental conditions that surround it.

The term responsive architecture was introduced by Nicholas Negroponte, who first conceived of it during the late 1960s when spatial design problems were being explored by applying cybernetics to architecture. Negroponte proposes that responsive architecture is the natural product of the integration of computing power into built spaces and structures, and that better performing, more rational buildings are the result. Negroponte also extends this mixture to include the concepts of recognition, intention, contextual variation, and meaning into computing and its successful (ubiquitous) integration into architecture. This cross-fertilization of ideas lasted for about eight years. Several important theories resulted from these efforts, but today Nicholas Negroponte’s contributions are the most obvious to architecture. His work moved the field of architecture in a technical, functional, and actuated direction.

Since Negroponte’s contribution, new works of responsive architecture have also emerged, but as aesthetic creations—rather than functional ones. The works of Diller & Scofidio (Blur), dECOi (Aegis Hypo-Surface), and NOX (The Freshwater Pavilion, NL) are all classifiable as types of responsive architecture. Each of these works monitors fluctuations in the environment and alters its form in response to these changes. The Blur project by Diller & Scofidio relies upon the responsive characteristics of a cloud to change its form while blowing in the wind. In the work of dECOi, responsiveness is enabled by a programmable façade, and finally in the work of NOX, a programmable audio–visual interior.

All of these works depend upon the abilities of computers to continuously calculate and join digital models that are programmable, to the real world and the events that shape it.

Finally an account of the development of the use of responsive systems and their history in respect to recent architectural theory can be found in Tristan d'Estree Sterk's recent opening keynote address (ACADIA 2009) entitled "Thoughts for Gen X— Speculating about the Rise of Continuous Measurement in Architecture"

== Current work ==
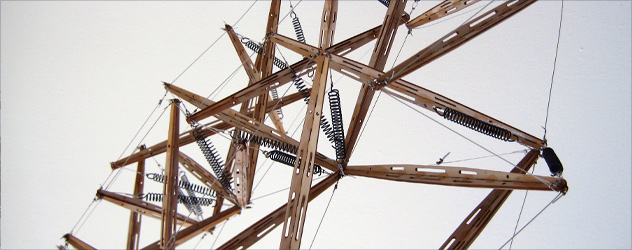
Actuated Tensegrity Structure (Prototype) by ORAMBRA

While a considerable amount of time and effort has been spent on intelligent homes in recent years, the emphasis here has been mainly on developing computerized systems and electronics to adapt the interior of the building or its rooms to the needs of residents. Research in the area of responsive architecture has had far more to do with the building structure itself, its ability to adapt to changing weather conditions and to take account of light, heat and cold. This could theoretically be achieved by designing structures consisting of rods and strings which would bend in response to wind, distributing the load in much the same way as a tree. Similarly, windows would respond to light, opening and closing to provide the best lighting and heating conditions inside the building.

This line of research, known as actuated tensegrity, relies on changes in structures controlled by actuators which in turn are driven by computerized interpreters of the real world conditions.

Climate adaptive building shells (CABS) can be identified as a sub-domain of responsive architecture, with special emphasis on dynamic features in facades and roofs. CABS can repeatedly and reversibly change some of its functions, features or behavior over time in response to changing performance requirements and variable boundary conditions, with the aim of improving overall building performance.

== Some key contributors ==
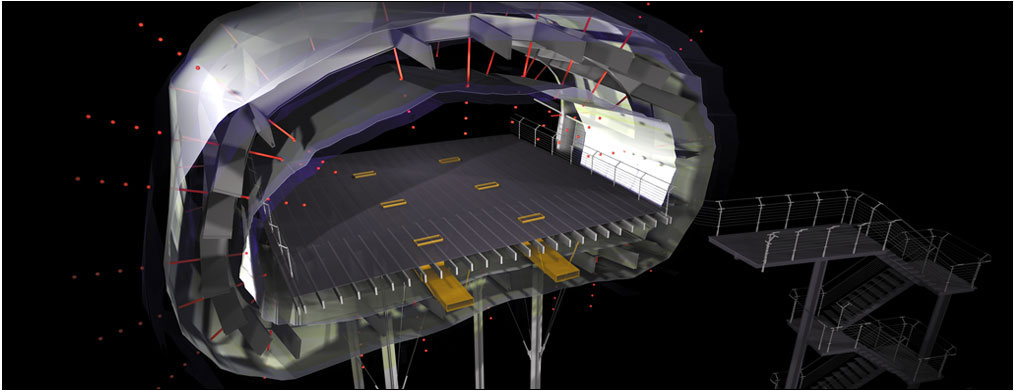
A building that changes shape by ORAMBRA

Tristan Sterk of The Bureau For Responsive Architecture and The School of the Art Institute of Chicago and Robert Skelton of UCSD in San Diego are working together on actuated tensegrity, experimenting with pneumatically controlled rods and wires which change the shape of a building in response to sensors both outside and inside the structure. Their goal is to limit and reduce the impact of buildings on natural environments.

MIT's Kinetic Design Group has been developing the concept of intelligent kinetic systems which are defined as "architectural spaces and objects that can physically re-configure themselves to meet changing needs." They draw on structural engineering, embedded computation and adaptable architecture. The objective is to demonstrate that energy use and the environmental quality of buildings could be rendered more efficient and affordable by making use of a combination of these technologies.

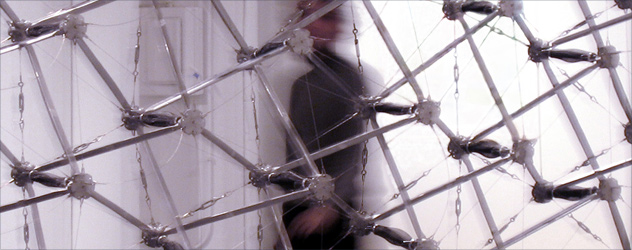
Full Scale Actuated Tensegrity Structure (Prototype) by ORAMBRA

Daniel Grünkranz of the University of Applied Arts Vienna is currently undertaking PhD research in the field of Phenomenology as it applies to Responsive Architectures and Technologies.

Depicted left: A full scale actuated tensegrity prototype built from cast aluminium, stainless steel components and pneumatic muscles (pneumatic muscles provided by Shadow Robotics UK) by Tristan d'Estree Sterk and The Office for Robotic Architectural Media (2003). These types of structural systems use variable and controllable rigidity to provide architects and engineers with systems that have a controllable shape. As a form of ultra-lightweight structure these systems offer a primary method for reducing the embodied energy used in construction processes.

== Bibliography ==
- Sterk, T.: 'Thoughts for Gen X— Speculating about the Rise of Continuous Measurement in Architecture' in Sterk, Loveridge, Pancoast "Building A Better Tomorrow" Proceedings of the 29th annual conference of the Association of Computer Aided Design in Architecture, The Art Institute of Chicago, 2009. ISBN 978-0-9842705-0-7
- Beesley, Philip; Hirosue, Sachiko; Ruxton, Jim; Trankle, Marion; Turner, Camille: Responsive Architectures: Subtle Technologies, Riverside Architectural Press, 2006, 239 p., ISBN 0-9780978-0-7
- Bullivant, Lucy, 'Responsive Environments: architecture, art and design', V&A Contemporary, 2006. London:Victoria and Albert Museum. A detailed analysis of the emergence of responsive environments as a multidisciplinary phenomenon, nurtured by museums, arts agencies and resulting from self-initiated activities by practitioners working in different cultural contexts. ISBN 1-85177-481-5
- Bullivant, Lucy, 'Interactive Design Environments'. London: AD/John Wiley & Sons, 2007. The follow-up to '4dspace', '4dsocial' is similarly a group of essays by different authors. It accents the creative role of museums in incubating new practices, terminology in this field, and the impact of interactive media installations in public spaces with a social message. ISBN 978-0-470-31911-6
- Bullivant, Lucy, '4dspace: Interactive Design Environments'. London: AD/John Wiley & Sons, 2005. An in-depth, multi-author investigation of the factors leading to and shaping the evolution of this hybrid field, featuring international practitioners. ISBN 0-470-09092-8
- Negroponte, N.: Soft Architecture Machines, Cambridge, MA: MIT Press, 1975. 239 p., ISBN 0-262-14018-7

== See also ==
- Climate adaptive building shells
- Four-dimensional product
- List of home automation topics
- Responsive computer-aided design
