= Guto Requena =

Brazilian architect

- Born: November 27, 1979 (age 46); Sorocaba, Brazil
- Education: University of São Paulo
- Occupation: Architect
- Practice: Estudio Guto Requena

Guto Requena (born November 27, 1979) is a Brazilian architect and designer. He graduated in Architecture & Urbanism from the São Carlos Engineering School, a faculty of the University of São Paulo, in 1999.

== Career ==
Guto Requena is the creative director of the Estudio Guto Requena, working on objects, interiors, architecture and cities. He founded Estudio Guto Requena in 2008 and has since acted as a design consultant, writer and professor in addition to developing interior architecture, interactive installations and product design.

== Academics ==
Requena is representative of a new generation of architects and designers involved in the discussion of interactivity and its effects on architecture and design; his work focuses in new digital technologies, cyberculture, hybrid realities, new lifestyles, affective memory and Brazilian culture.

His interest in this field led him to work during nine years as an integrant of the research group “Center of Interactive Living Studies of the University of São Paulo”, which in its turn led him to a master's degree at the University of São Paulo and respective dissertation.

He taught project design at Panamericana – School of Arts and Design – and at IED – European Institute of Design, in São Paulo – at both graduation and master levels.

== Awards ==
- ArchDaily's Building of the Year Award 2014 – Interior Architecture – Walmart São Paulo.
- BID 2012 – Bienal Ibero Americana de Design, as the best Space Design in Brazil for the Exhibition "Roteiro Musical de São Paulo".
- "Best in Architecture Brazil – 2010" for nightclub HOT HOT, under category "Bars & Nightclubs".
- “Young Brazilian Awards” as recognition for lecturing on 70 workshops all over the country.

== Media ==
Since 2012 Guto has a design column at newspaper Folha de S.Paulo where he writes about design, architecture and urbanism.

His academic achievements and activity as a teacher in reputed design schools made him a national reference in the subject of contemporary architecture and design in the specialized media. He is creator, screenwriter and host of a show on design in cable/satellite Brazilian television channel GNT called Nos Trinques; its first season aired from March to December in 2011.

In 2012 and 2013 Guto developed design web series for the same channel, recorded in Milan, Paris, Amsterdam and London.

== Selected projects ==
Some of his best-known works are the São Paulo nightclub Hot Hot (2009), the collection of vases Once Upon a Time, the Samba Collection, the 3D printed "Noize Chair", the exhibition Musical Tour of São Paulo, the interactive space for Agência D3 (2011), and the Walmart.com Brazilian headquarters.

In 2012 Guto was selected by Google to develop the project for their Brazilian headquarter in São Paulo.

=== Exhibitions ===
Guto exhibited at:

2014

- Beijing Design Week – Beijing, China;
- Guild Design Fair – Cape Town, South Africa;
- Design Days Dubai – Dubai, United Arab Emirates;
- Laufen – Impressões, at Expo Revestir – São Paulo, Brazil;
- Losing My America – At Cappellini, during Milan Design Week – Milan, Italy;
- From Tradition to 3D Printing, at Carlton Hotel Baglioni during Milan Design Week – Milan, Italy;

2013

- Cabinets of Curiosity at Mint Shop during London Design Festival – London, England;
- Museu da Casa Brasileira, BID – Bienal Iberoamericana de Diseño – São Paulo, Brazil;
- Spazio Rossana Orlandi during Milan Design Fair – Milan, Italy;
- SPDW – São Paulo Design Weekend at CCCC Exhibition, Galeria Ovo – São Paulo, Brazil;
- IBDF – International Business Design Fair, with Coletivo Amor de Madre Gallery – Mexico City, Mexico;
- Inventory Series 04: Time, during Design Miami – Miami, USA;

2012

- Brazil S/A during Milan Design Fair – Milan, Italy;
- fuiparaspelembreidevc, Galeria Coletivo Amor de Madre – São Paulo, Brazil;
- SPDW – São Paulo Design Weekend at Casa Juici + Phosphorus – São Paulo, Brazil;
- BID – Bienal Iberoamericana de Diseño – Madrid, Spain;
- Brazil Bienal of Design – Belo Horizonte, Brazil;
- Inventory Series 03: Experience of a City, during Design Miami – Miami, United States;

=== Product design ===
- NOIZE CHAIR – A 3D printed chair created by the mix of soundscapes collected in the streets of São Paulo Downtown with Giraffe Chair from Lina Bo Bardi;
- NOIZE LIVE – Performance during São Paulo Design Week where Noize Chair process were open to the audience to create live their own unique mini-noize Chair 3D printed.
- LOVE PROJECT – Sensors collects emotions in live narratives of Love Stories and uses this data as parametric input to generate 3D printed daily objects.
- ONCE UPON A TIME COLLECTION – Guto's grandmother retold him his old fables from childhood. The narrative drama into her voice was analyzed as data input for the parametric interface to generate the molds of Glassblowed vases.
- TEA HUG – A tapestry created for Tai Ping developed using an old painting of the first colony of Chinese immigrants in Brazil with its color filled by parametric use of Chinese song
- PARAMETRIC DES-APARECIDA – A wood Brazilian Saint unifies crafts and parametric techniques
Selected Projects
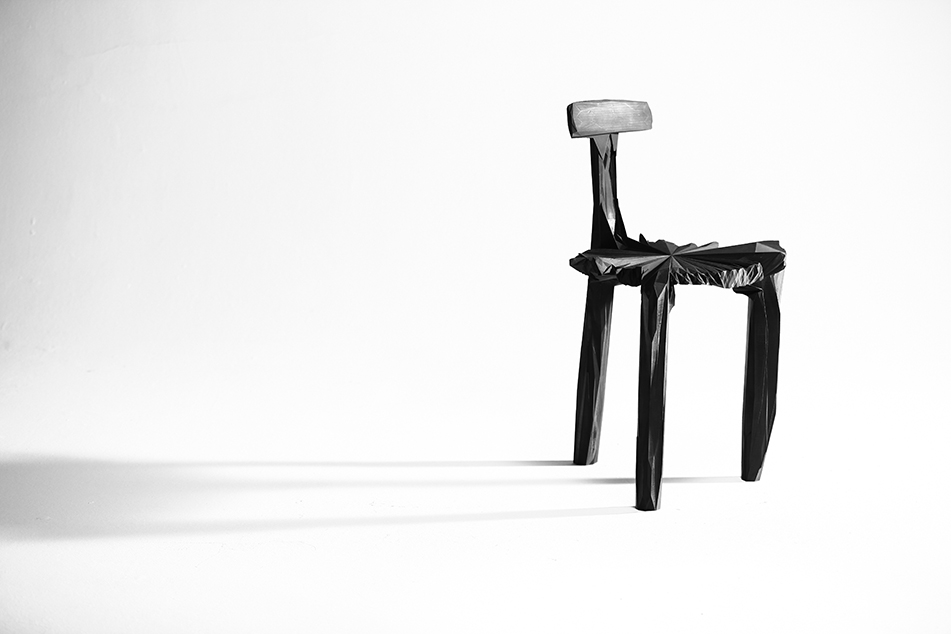
Noize Chair

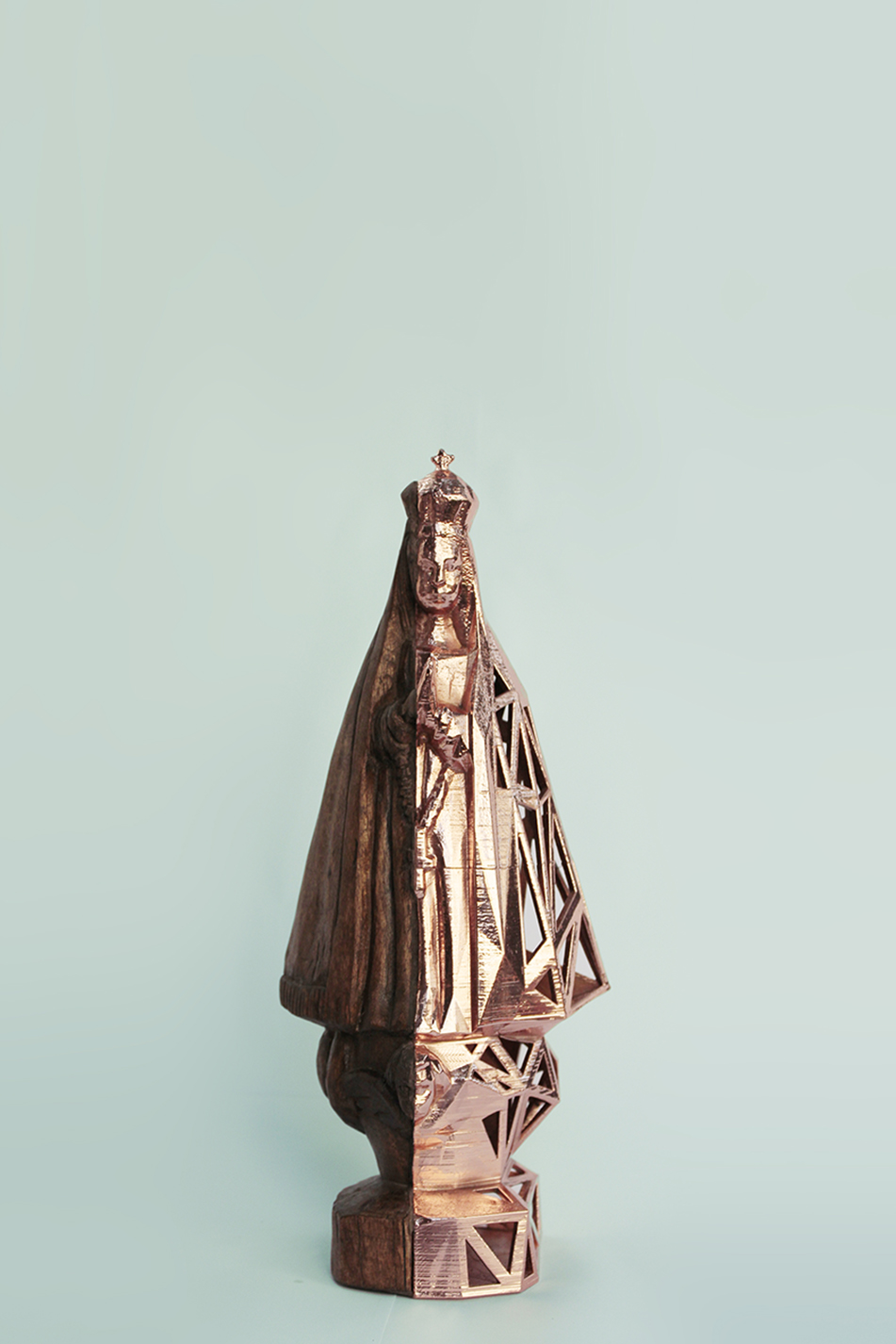
Nossa Senhora des-Aparecida

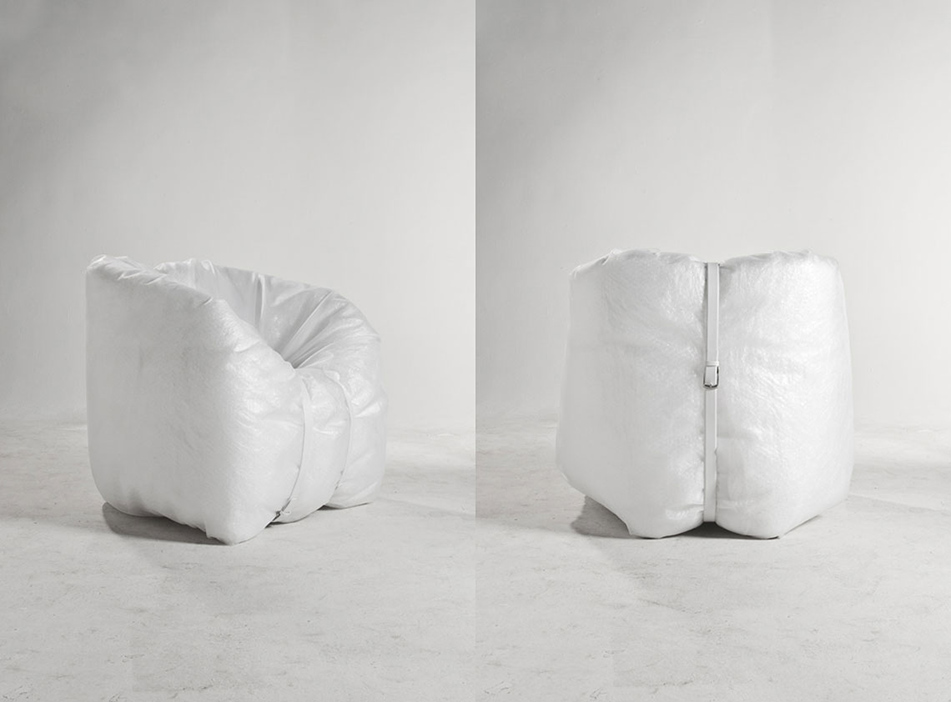
Bubble Chair

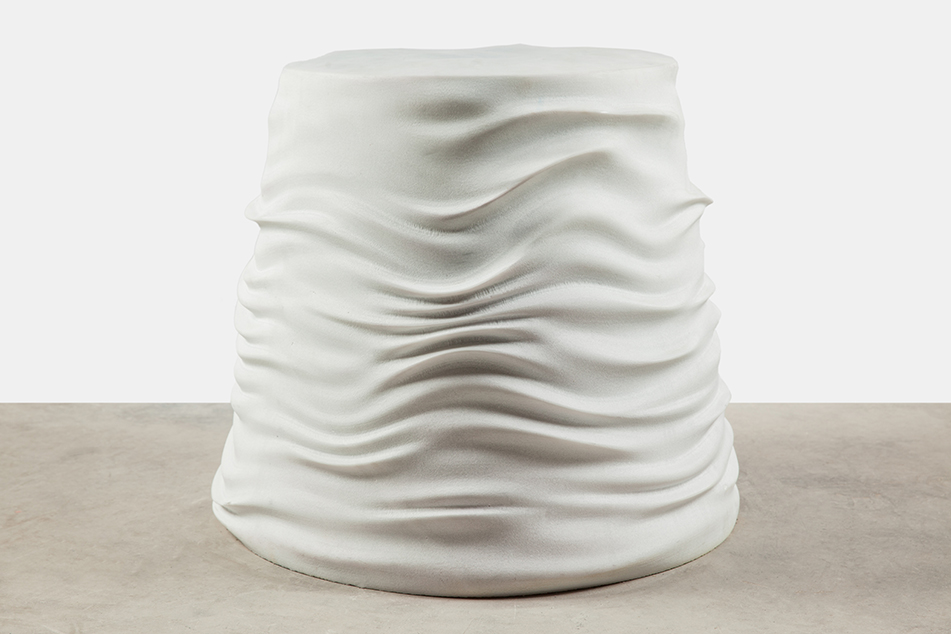
Samba Collection

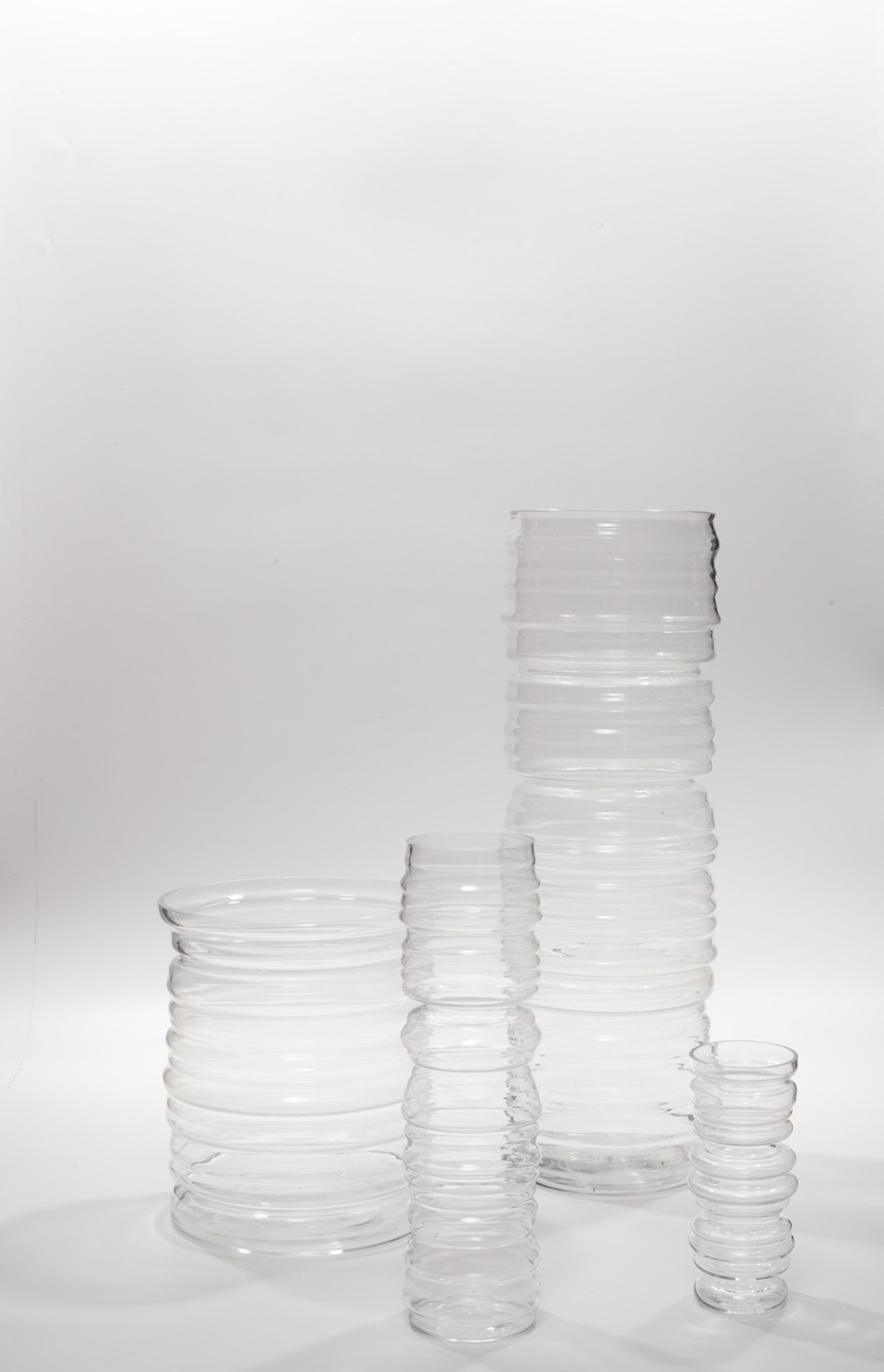
Once Upon a Time

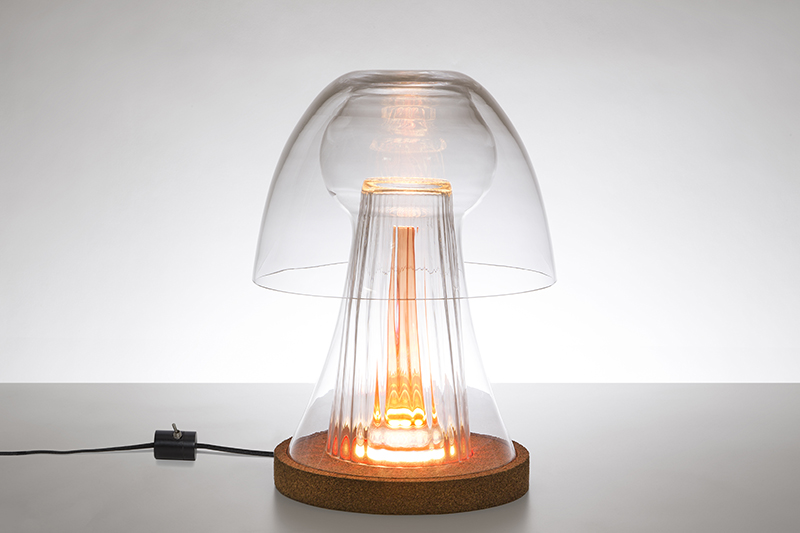
Alma Collection

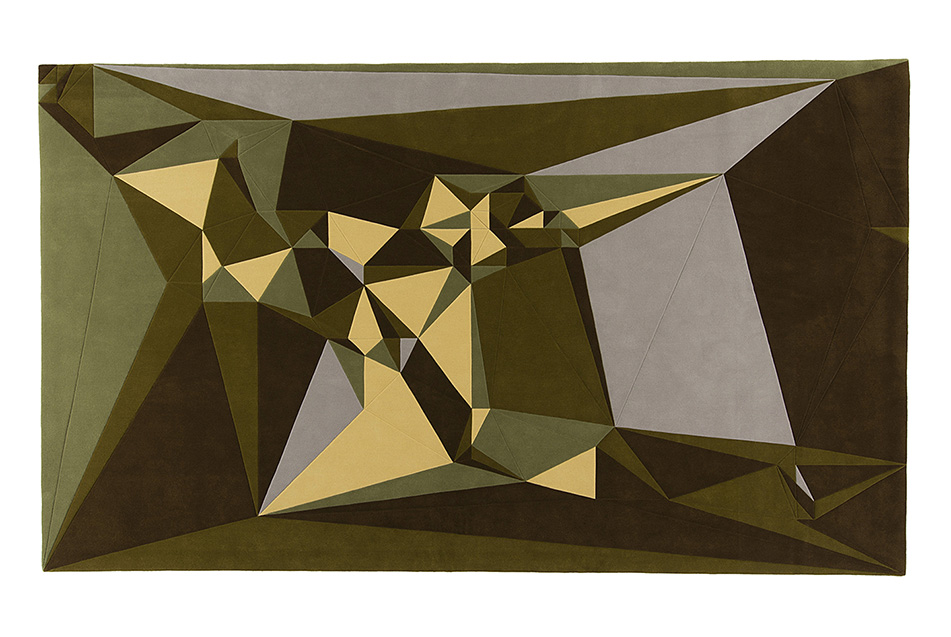
Tea Hug for Tai Ping

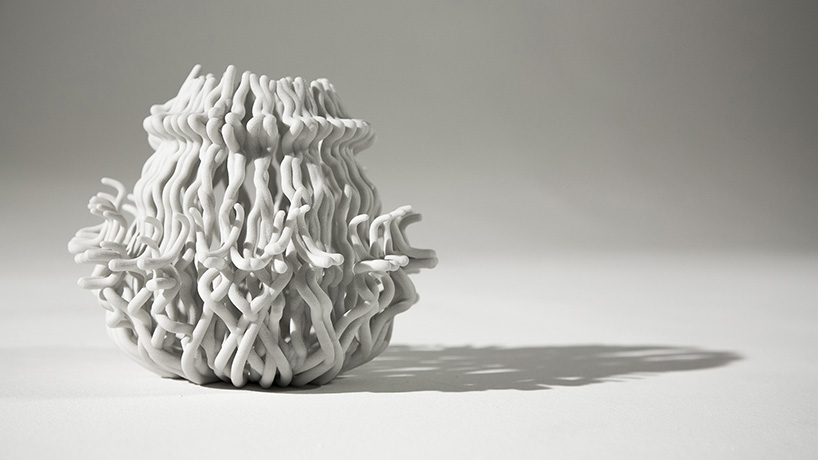
Love Project

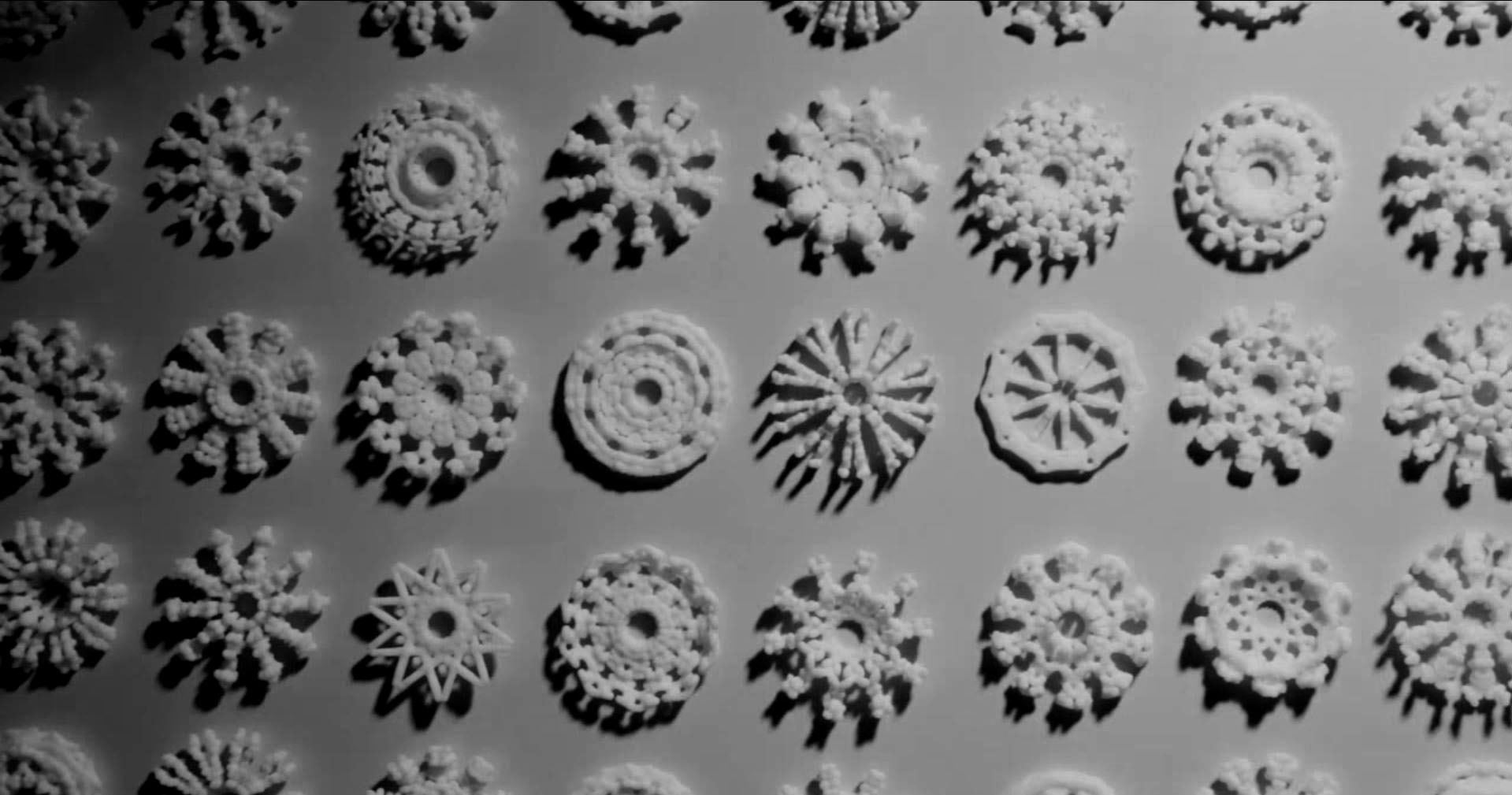
Love Project Experiment 2

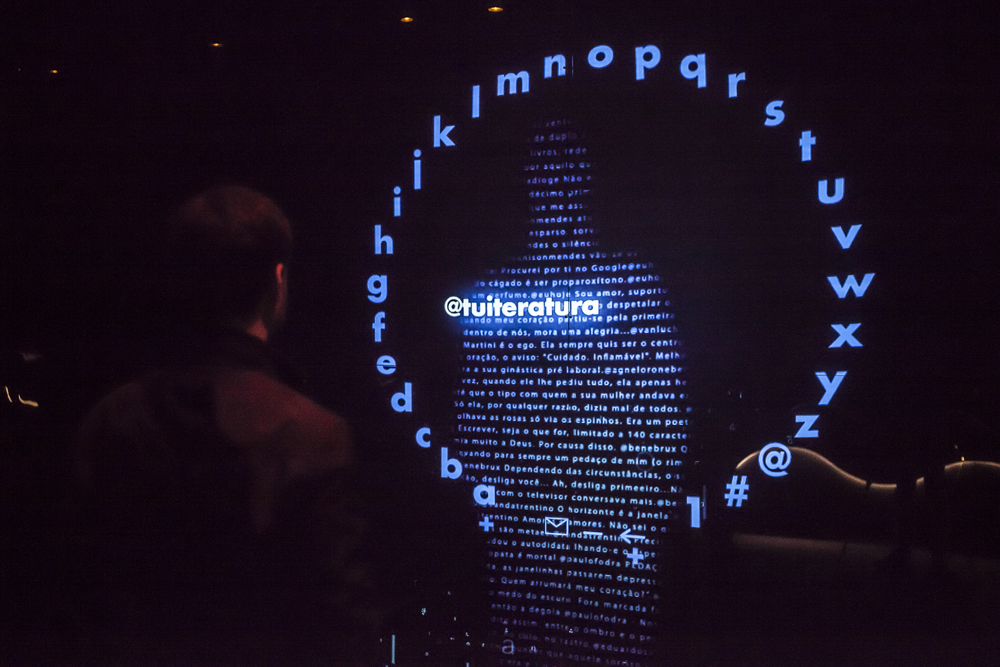
Tuiteratura

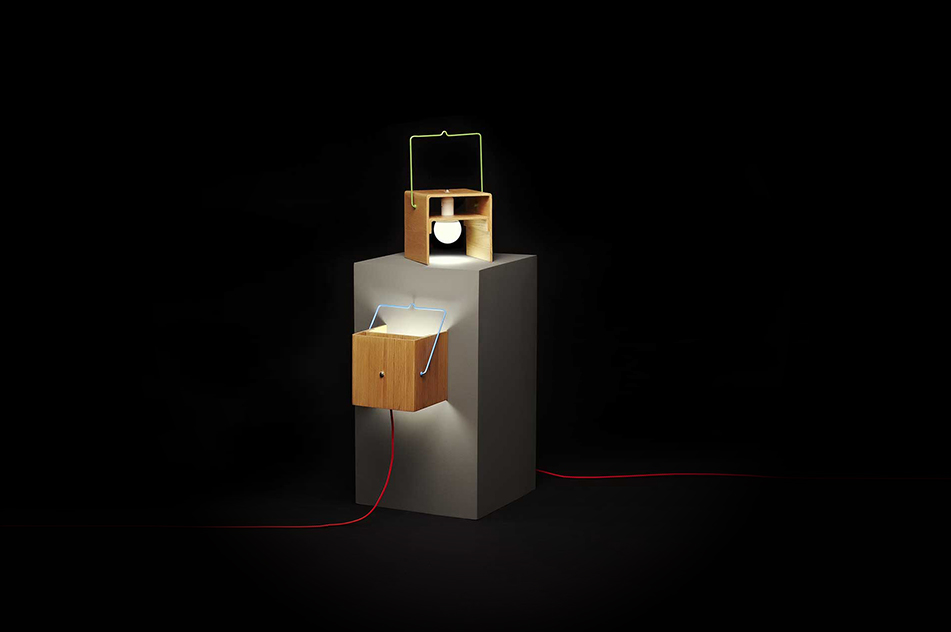
Play Collection

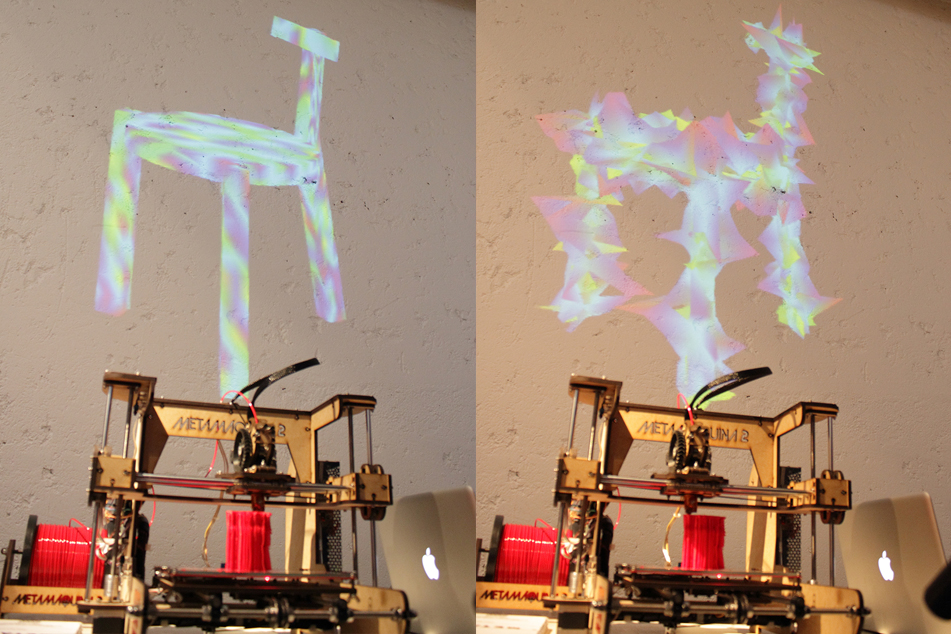
Noize live
