= Torrieri =

Torrieri is an Italian surname. Notable people with the surname include:

- Diana Torrieri (1913–2007), Italian actress
- Don Torrieri, American author, electrical engineer, and mathematician
- Marco Torrieri (born 1978), Italian sprinter
- Raúl Torrieri (born 1944), Uruguayan rower
