= Martin Cooper (inventor) =

American engineer (born 1928)

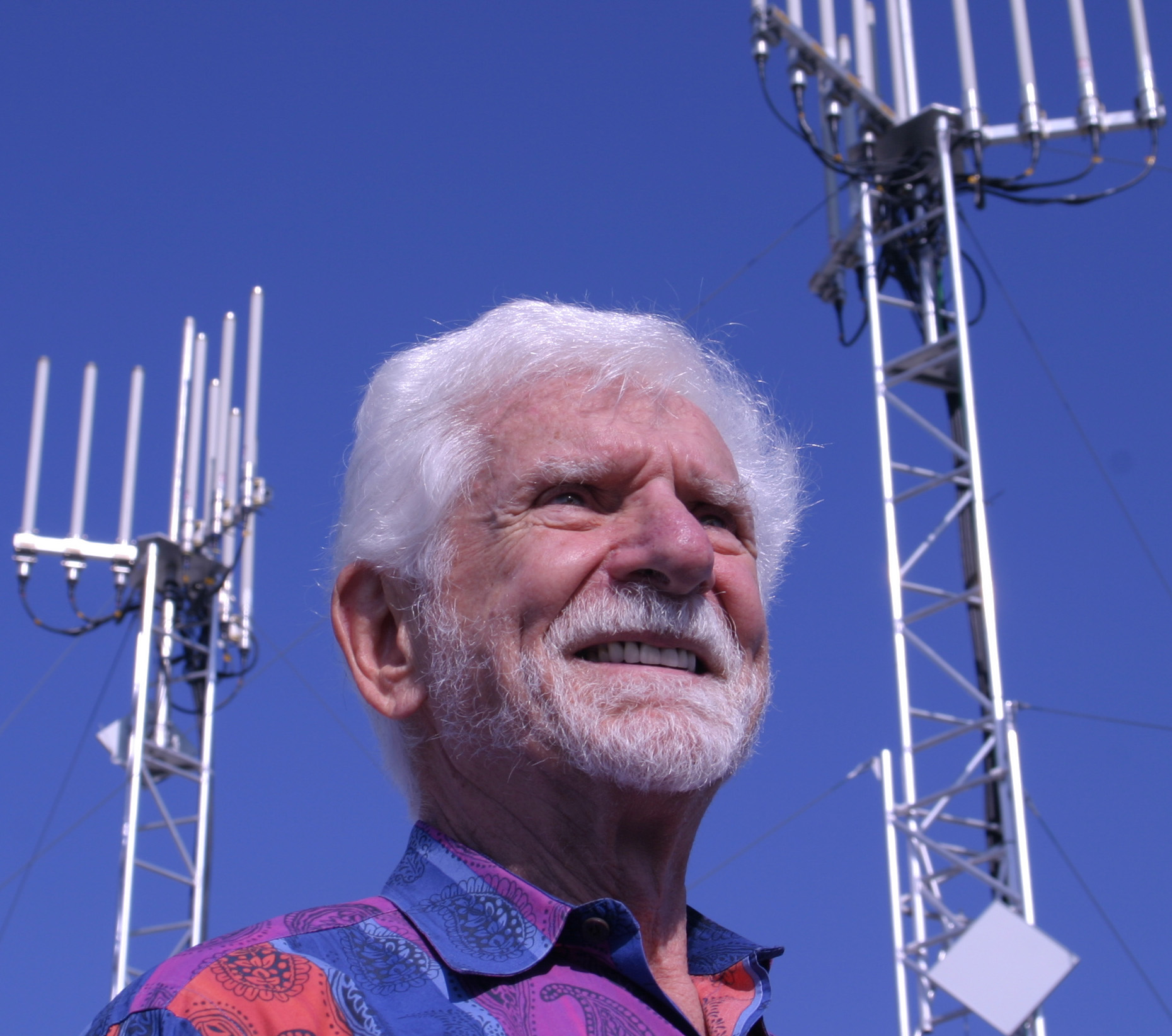
- Cooper in 2007
- Born: December 26, 1928 (age 97); Chicago, Illinois, U.S.
- Other name: Marty Cooper
- Education: Illinois Institute of Technology (BS, MS)
- Occupations: Inventor; entrepreneur; executive
- Known for: Inventor of the first handheld cellular mobile phone
- Title: Motorola; Founder & CEO of ArrayComm; Co-founder and chairman of Dyna LLC
- Spouse: Arlene Harris (m. 1991)
- Awards: Marconi Prize (2013), ITU 150 Awards (2015)
- Website: www.dynallc.com

Martin Cooper (born December 26, 1928) is an American inventor and electrical engineer. He is a pioneer in the wireless communications industry, especially in radio spectrum management, with 11 patents in the field. He is considered the "father of the (handheld) cell phone".

On April 3, 1973, Cooper placed the first public call from a prototype handheld portable phone (distinct from the car phone) while working at Motorola, from a Manhattan sidewalk to his counterpart at competitor Bell Labs. This was made possible by an experimental radio base station built to transmit on the low-power localized cellular spectrum, as opposed to traditional mobile radio telephones. Motorola built the station on the roof of Burlington House and hardwired it to the AT&T landline telephone network. For the next decade, Cooper lobbied the FCC and reprised the first handheld cellular mobile phone, leading the team that redeveloped it and brought it to market in 1983 when the first cellular network in the United States was launched to the public.

Cooper is co-founder of numerous communications companies with his wife and business partner Arlene Harris; He is co-founder and current Chairman of Dyna LLC, in Del Mar, California. Cooper also sits on committees supporting the U.S. Federal Communications Commission and the United States Department of Commerce. In 2010, Cooper was elected a member of the National Academy of Engineering for leadership in the creation and deployment of the cellular portable hand-held telephone. He received the 2015 IEEE Masaru Ibuka Consumer Electronics Award for this work.

== Education ==
Cooper was born in Chicago to Ukrainian Jewish immigrants. He graduated from Illinois Institute of Technology (IIT) in 1950 and served as a submarine officer during the Korean War.

In 1957, Cooper earned his master's degree from IIT in electrical engineering. In 2004, he received an honorary doctorate degree from IIT. He serves on the university's board of trustees.

== Career ==
=== Motorola ===
Cooper left his first job at Teletype Corporation in Chicago in 1954 and joined Motorola, Inc. (Schaumburg, Illinois) as a senior development engineer in the mobile equipment group. He developed products including the first cellular-like portable handheld police radio system, produced for the Chicago police department in 1967.

By the early 1970s, Cooper headed Motorola's communications systems division. Here he conceived of the first portable cellular phone in 1973 and led the 10-year process of bringing it to market. Car phones had been in limited use in large U.S. cities since the 1930s but Cooper championed cellular telephony for more general personal, portable communications. He believed the cellular phone should be a "personal telephone – something that would represent an individual so you could assign a number; not to a place, not to a desk, not to a home, but to a person."

Top management at Motorola supported Cooper's mobile phone concept, investing $100 million between 1973 and 1993 before any revenues were realized. Cooper assembled a team that designed and assembled a product in less than 90 days. That original handset, called the DynaTAC 8000x (DYNamic Adaptive Total Area Coverage) weighed 2.5 pounds (1.1 kg), measured 10 inches (25 cm) long and was dubbed "the brick" or "the shoe" phone. A very substantial part of the DynaTAC was the battery, which weighed four to five times more than a modern cell phone. The phone had only 30 minutes of talk time before requiring a 10-hour recharge but according to Cooper, "The battery lifetime wasn't really a problem because you couldn't hold that phone up for that long!" By 1983 and after four iterations, the handset was reduced to half its original weight.

Cooper is the lead inventor named on "radio telephone system" filed on October 17, 1973, with the U.S. Patent Office and later issued as U.S. Patent 3,906,166. John Francis Mitchell, Motorola's Chief of Portable Communication Products (and Cooper's Manager and Mentor) and the engineers who worked for Cooper and Mitchell are also named on the patent.

On April 3, 1973, Cooper and Mitchell demonstrated two working phones to the media and to passers-by prior to walking into a scheduled press conference at the New York City Hilton in midtown Manhattan. Standing on Sixth avenue near the Hilton, Cooper made the first handheld cellular phone call in public from the prototype DynaTAC. The call connected him to a base station Motorola had installed on the roof of the Burlington House (now the AllianceBernstein Building) and into the AT&T land-line telephone system. Reporters and onlookers watched as Cooper dialed the number of his chief competitor Dr. Joel S. Engel at AT&T. "Joel, this is Marty. I'm calling you from a cell phone, a real handheld portable cell phone." That public demonstration landed the DynaTAC on the July 1973 cover of Popular Science Magazine. As Cooper recalls from the experience: "I made numerous calls, including one where I crossed the street while talking to a New York radio reporter – probably one of the most dangerous things I have ever done in my life."

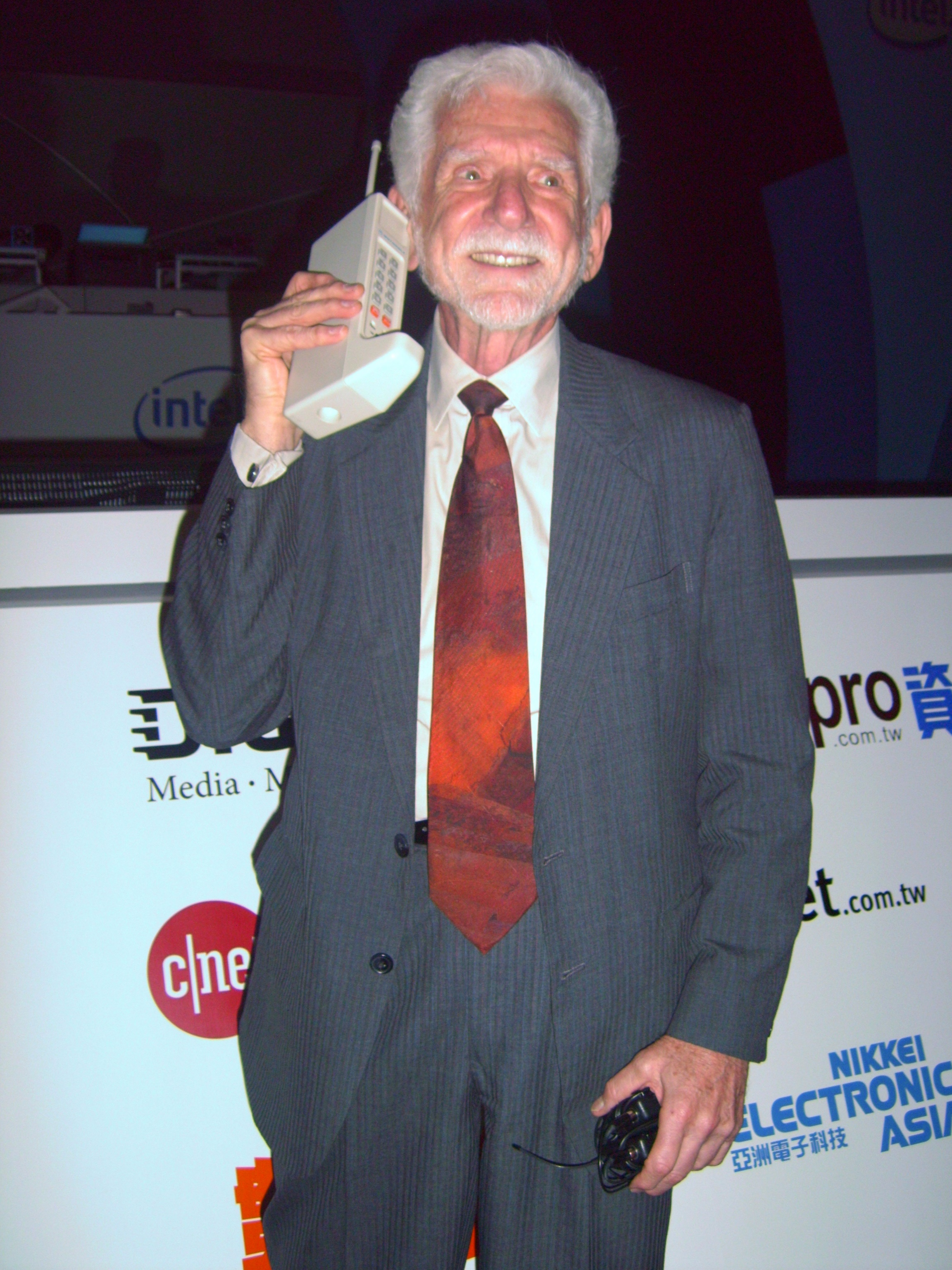
Cooper holding a DynaTAC cellphone in 2007

That first cell phone began a fundamental technology and communications market shift to making phone calls to a person instead of to a place. Bell Labs had introduced the idea of cellular communications in 1947, but their first systems were limited to car phones which required roughly 30 pounds (12 kg) of equipment in the trunk. Motorola gained Federal Communications Commission (FCC) approval for cellular licenses to be assigned to competing entities and prevented an AT&T monopoly on cellular service.

Cooper worked at Motorola for 29 years; building and managing both its paging and cellular businesses. He also led the creation of trunked mobile radio, quartz crystal oscillators, liquid crystal displays, piezo-electric components, Motorola A.M. stereo technology and various mobile and portable two-way radio product lines.

Cooper rose to Vice-President and Corporate Director of Research and Development at Motorola. In addition to his work on the mobile cellular phone, he was instrumental in expanding the technology of pagers from use within a single building to use across multiple cities. Cooper also worked with inventor Clifford L. Rose to fix a flaw in quartz crystals used in Motorola's radios which encouraged the company to mass-produce the first crystals used in wrist watches.

=== Dyna LLC ===
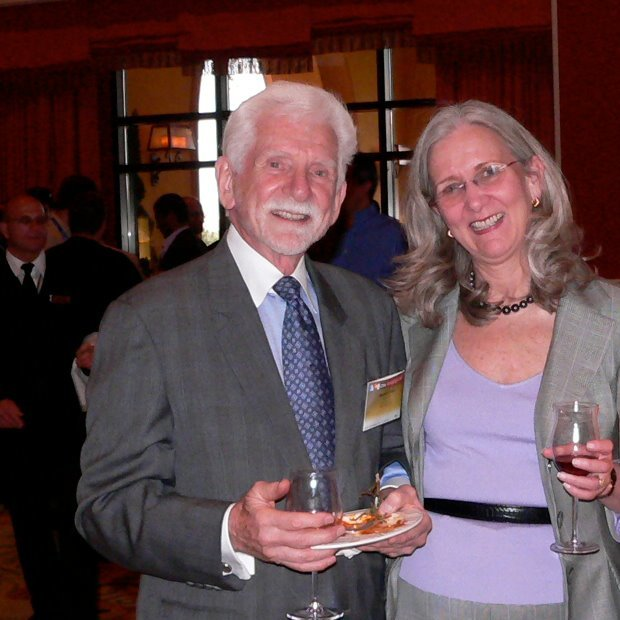
Martin Cooper and Arlene Harris

Cooper and his wife Arlene Harris founded Dyna LLC in 1986 as a home base for their developmental and support activities for the new companies, Subscriber Computing Inc., Cellular Pay Phone, Inc. (CPPI), SOS Wireless Communications and Accessible Wireless; the later two of which together created the underpinning for the creation of GreatCall, were all launched from Dyna LLC.

From his Dyna headquarters Cooper continues to write and lecture about wireless communications, technological innovation, the Internet and R&D management. He serves on industry, civic and national governmental groups including the U.S. Department of Commerce Spectrum Advisory Committee that advises the Secretary of Commerce of the United States on spectrum policy and the Federal Communications Commission's (FCC) Technological Advisory Council.

=== GreatCall, Inc ===
In 1986 Cooper co-founded Cellular Payphone Inc. (CPPI), the parent company of GreatCall, Inc., Innovator of the Jitterbug cell phone (in partnership with Samsung). GreatCall is the first complete end-to-end value-added service provider in the cellular industry to focus on simplicity with its primary emphasis on senior citizens.

=== Arraycomm ===
In 1992 Cooper co-founded Arraycomm, a developer of software for mobile antenna technologies. Under his leadership, the Company grew from a seed-funded startup in San Jose, California, into the world leader in smart antenna technology with 400 patents issued or pending, worldwide.

=== Energous.com ===
Cooper joined the board of directors from 2015 to 2019.

== Cooper's law ==
Cooper found that the ability to transmit different radio communications simultaneously and in the same place has grown at the same pace since Guglielmo Marconi's first transmissions in 1895. This led Cooper to formulate the Law of Spectral Efficiency, otherwise known as Cooper's Law. The law states that the maximum number of voice conversations or equivalent data transactions that can be conducted in all of the useful radio spectrum over a given area doubles every 30 months.

== Publications ==
=== Latest publications ===
"The Myth of Spectrum Scarcity" Position Paper, March 2010.

"Mobile WiMax – Fourth-Generation Wireless," Bechtel Communications Technical Journal, September 2007.

"The Need for Simplicity," in the anthology "Mobile Persuasion: 20 Perspectives on the Future of Behavior Change," published by Stanford University in 2007.

"Personal Communications in 2025" for Eta Kappa Nu Electrical and Computer Engineering Honor Society, Autumn 2005.

"Antennas Get Smart" in Scientific American, July 2003.

"Everyone is Wrong" in Technology Review, June 2001.

== Awards and affiliations ==
- Mensa
- 1984 – IEEE Centennial Medal and Fellow
- 1995 – Wharton Infosys Business Transformation Award
- 1996 – Radio Club of America Fred Link Award and Life Fellow with the International Engineering Consortium
- 2000 – "Red Herring" Magazine Top Ten Entrepreneurs of 2000
- 2000 – RCR Wireless News Wireless Hall of Fame Inaugural Member
- 2002 – American Computer Museum George Stibitz Computer and Communications Pioneer Award
- 2002 – Wireless Systems Design Industry Leader Award
- 2006 – CITA Emerging Technologies Award
- 2007 – Wireless World Research Forum Fellow
- 2007 – Global Spec Great Moments Engineering Award
- 2008 – CE Consumer Electronics Hall of Fame Award
- October 2008 – Top U.S. Wireless Innovators of All Time.
- 2009 – Prince of Asturias Award for scientific and technical research.
- 2009 – Life Trustee, Illinois Institute of Technology
- 2010 – Radio Club of America, Lifetime Achievement Award
- October 2010 – Member, National Academy of Engineering
- 2011 – Inaugural Mikhail Gorbachev: The Man Who Changed the World Awards Nominee
- 2011 – Webby Award for Lifetime Achievement
- 2012 – Washington Society of Engineers, Washington Award
- 2013 – Charles Stark Draper Prize, National Academy of Engineering
- 2013 – Marconi Prize
- 2013 – Honorary doctorate awarded by the students and the rector of Hasselt University on the occasion of the university's 40th anniversary.
- 2014 IEEE-Eta Kappa Nu Eminent Member
- 2019 – Leaves the Energous board of directors.
- 2025 - Recipient of the National Medal of Technology and Innovation.
- Marconi Society Lifetime Achievement Award.
