= Zhenghe Feng =

Chinese engineer

Zhenghe Feng from the Tsinghua University, Beijing, China was named Fellow of the Institute of Electrical and Electronics Engineers (IEEE) in 2012 for contributions to smart antennas and mobile communications, and for leadership in microwave and antenna education.
