= Space Division =

Space division may refer to:

- 9th Space Division
- General Electric Space Division
- Space and Missile Systems Center
- literally a division of space, as in case of Space-division multiple access
