= Mathini Sellathurai =

Electrical engineer

Mathini Sellathurai is an electrical engineer whose research topics include wireless communications, radar, cognitive radio, and multiple-input and multiple-output radio communications. Educated in Sri Lanka, Sweden and Canada, she has worked in Canada, the US, and Scotland, where she is professor in signal processing and dean of science and engineering at Heriot-Watt University.

== Education and career ==
Sellathurai has a bachelor's degree in engineering from the University of Peradeniya in Sri Lanka. She earned a licenciate in signal processing and communications in 1997 from the KTH Royal Institute of Technology in Stockholm, Sweden, and completed a Ph.D. in 2001 from McMaster University in Hamilton, Ontario. Her doctoral dissertation was supervised by Simon Haykin and concerned the Bell Laboratories Layered Space-Time architecture for exploiting multi-path wireless communications; it won the 2002 Natural Sciences and Engineering Council Doctoral Prize. As a doctoral student, she also worked as a visiting researcher at Bell Labs in the US.

After postdoctoral research at the Communications Research Centre Canada from 2001 to 2004, she joined Heriot-Watt University in 2004.

== Recognition ==
Sellathurai was named an IEEE Fellow, in the 2024 class of fellows, "for contributions to multi-user, multi-functional and multi-antenna wireless communications".
