= Sellathurai =

Sellathurai is a surname from Sri Lanka. Notable people with the surname include:

- Mathini Sellathurai (fl. 1997), Sri Lankan electrical engineer
- Prashanth Sellathurai (born 1986), Australian gymnast
