= Arlene Harris (inventor) =

American inventor

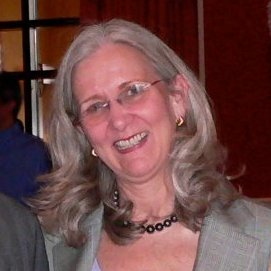
- Born: June 6, 1948 (age 78); Los Angeles, California, U.S.
- Occupations: Entrepreneur; Inventor
- Employer: Dyna LLC
- Known for: Dyna LLC; Wrethink; GreatCall
- Title: Founder and CEO of Dyna LLC
- Spouse: Martin Cooper (m. 1991)
- Website: www.dynallc.com www.wrethinking.com

Arlene Joy Harris (born June 6, 1948) is an entrepreneur, inventor, investor, and policy advocate in the telecommunications industry. She is the president and co-founder of Dyna LLC, an incubator for start-up and early-stage organizations historically in the wireless technology field. Harris is widely recognized as a pioneer in mobile and wireless enterprise and an innovator of consumer products and services. In May 2007, she became the first female inductee of the Wireless Hall of Fame, and was named to the Consumer Technology Hall of Fame in 2017.

Harris started and built several companies. She was a founding member of many early cellular industry organizations and holds several patents in wireless communications. Her companies’ successes included achieving substantial market share for cellular billing systems, developing and implementing the first prepaid cellular service, and creating the first automated wireless management systems. Notably, she led the development and market introduction of the SOS phone, renamed the Jitterbug as part of her GreatCall organization. The Jitterbug phone was developed and launched in 2006 in partnership with Samsung. Subsequently, it was sold to a Chicago private equity company in July 2017 and acquired on August 15, 2018, by Best Buy Co, Inc.

== Career ==
Born and raised in Los Angeles, Harris began her career at the age of 12 as a mobile telephone switchboard operator for her family's business, Industrial Communications Systems (ICS), Inc. (sold to Metromedia in 1983, now Spok).

=== 2018–present ===
Don Norman Design Award

Harris is a Founding Director of Don Norman Design Award (DNDA).

Wrethink

Harris is currently working on Wrethink, a high-tech start-up company focused on consumer privacy and helping families use technology to organize and manage personal information.

Wrethinking

Harris and Martin Cooper started, Wrethinking, a foundation to support early-stage technology companies and other meaningful non-profits that embrace charitable and/or aligned social purposes. Wrethinking provides startup funding and continued support for the Internet Safety Labs (ISL). ISL promotes the use of disciplined and verifiable product safety protection concepts and rules in the creation of all software and its provision of services to connect consumer devices. Wrethinking also supports several other non-profits.)

Accessible Wireless

In 2001, Harris acquired cellular carrier Accessible Wireless in order to provide a home carrier service for offerings targeting low-usage services. Accessible Wireless enabled the wireless services delivered later by GreatCall, Inc., at a time when other wireless carriers did not support low-usage service or provide value-added services needed by GreatCall's customers.

GreatCall, Inc.

GreatCall, acquired by Best Buy on August 15, 2018, was founded by Harris to establish the Best Buy's connected health market entry. Harris conceived and led GreatCall through the development of the Jitterbug phone in partnership with Samsung. Jitterbug is a cellular device designed to provide wireless cellular access to less tech-savvy customers, such as senior citizens. Jitterbug was named to the New York Times “Top 10 List” of greatest technology ideas of 2006, per personal tech columnist David Pogue. It was a finalist in Yahoo's "Last Gadget Standing" competition at the Consumer Electronics Show in 2007 and was named by Reader's Digest as one of its “Top 100 Products”. In the same year, the Cellular Telecommunications Industry Association (CTIA), a trade association representing the wireless communications industry in the United States, recognized GreatCall with the wireless industry's coveted Andrew Seybold Choice Award for "Best New Company”. GreatCall was also acclaimed by the American Society on Aging with the Stevie Award for "Best Small Business in 2008”.

In 2009, GreatCall acquired Mobiwatch, a company focused on developing Mobile Personal Emergency Response Services (M-PERS), for an undisclosed amount and spent the following two years implementing a service that, along with Jitterbug, established GreatCall's connected health solution.

Wireless History Foundation

Harris founded the Wireless History Foundation in 2008 along with Liz Maxfield and Judith Lockwood Purcell. The Wireless History Foundation is a 501(c)(3) nonprofit organization formed to preserve and promote the history of the wireless industry. Harris remains on the organization's board of directors.

=== 1990–1999 ===
In 1994, Harris founded SOS Wireless Communications. SOS developed a phone and specialized services for making outgoing calls for urgent and occasional communications marketed primarily to elderly Americans.

=== 1980–1989 ===
In 1981, under the leadership of Harris, ICS developed the first wireless consumer healthcare application. Called Life Page, the program provided pagers to patients awaiting organ transplants. She later promoted and expanded the program to Telocator, the National Trade Association for independent wireless operators. (Telocator later became the Personal Communications Industry Association [PCIA], which recently changed its name to the Wireless Infrastructure Association [WIA].)

Under Harris and her family's direction, ICS became the largest single-city paging system in the world. Most notably, ICS was among the first of any category of business to create online computer systems to manage business subscriber offerings, now referred to as Customer Relationship Management (CRM).

In addition to its direct sales to businesses, ICS also supported the first wholesale wireless service in history, starting in 1972. This wholesale model promoted substantial growth and shareholder value for ICS, its suppliers, and its partners. Because of the success ICS realized in its wholesale strategy of bolstering opportunities for partners and service adoption by new users, its resale concept was mandated by the U.S. Federal Communications Commission (FCC) in the original cellular spectrum allocations in 1982. In 1983, Harris co-founded Cellular Business Systems, Inc. (CBSI), which was sold to Cincinnati Bell Information Systems in 1986 and is now Netcracker. At CBSI, Harris guided the development of a billing/CRM (customer relationship management) service bureau (currently known as SAAS—software-as-a-service). CBSI developed the first automated cellular service activation systems (referred to as “provisioning systems”) now used globally in retail locations to remotely and instantly activate cellular phones. Also, at CBSI, Harris served as one of three FCC committee members challenged to develop intersystem roaming protocols. The committee was established to create the methods by which cellular companies enabled and billed customers who visited their networks. The committee's work, along with subsequent efforts by CTIA, resulted in the Cellular Inter-carrier Billing Exchange Record (CIBER) used throughout the cellular industry.

In 1986, Harris founded the software company Subscriber Computing, Inc. which was acquired by Corsair Communications Inc. in April 1998. (Corsair was then sold to Lightbridge Inc. in 2000.) Susbscriber Computing, Inc. built and delivered systems to the largest paging companies in the world. These systems provided the first converged billing systems for cellular transmissions and Internet communications to leading global technology companies including Motorola, British Telecom, and Hutchinson. In 1988, Subscriber Computing, Inc. implemented the first communications methods used to support access to cellular services by low and no-credit consumers. This is now known as "prepaid" cellular service, which has grown to one of the primary choices for cellular customers. The advent of prepaid cellular service generated rapid cellular adoption in developing countries where consumer credit was scarce. Harris’ team used some of the same realtime techniques employed in prepaid cellular service for the development of systems created to prevent the fraudulent use of cellular phones – a problem that caused revenue losses for cellular carriers due to stolen airtime.

In 1986, Harris also founded the company Cellular Pay Phone, Inc. (CPPI), where she developed her first patented invention, the first unique application of cellular service – custom designed cellular phone and a program-controlled end-to-end management system (created with Mal Gurian at OKI Electronics and the Cellular Mobile Division at Motorola). This offering made CPPI the first niche cellular reseller to create a tightly integrated system to support cellular service with automated payments by credit card. This system was licensed to GTE Mobilnet for use in its ViaCall service, which provided pay cellphones in public vehicles, limousines, trains, barges, and oil rigs. In 1986, Harris launched Dyna LLC in Chicago, Illinois, and later relocated the organization to Del Mar, California, to incubate and spin out new ideas and to help young companies and entrepreneurs.
