= Gerard J. Foschini =

American telecommunications engineer

Gerard Joseph Foschini
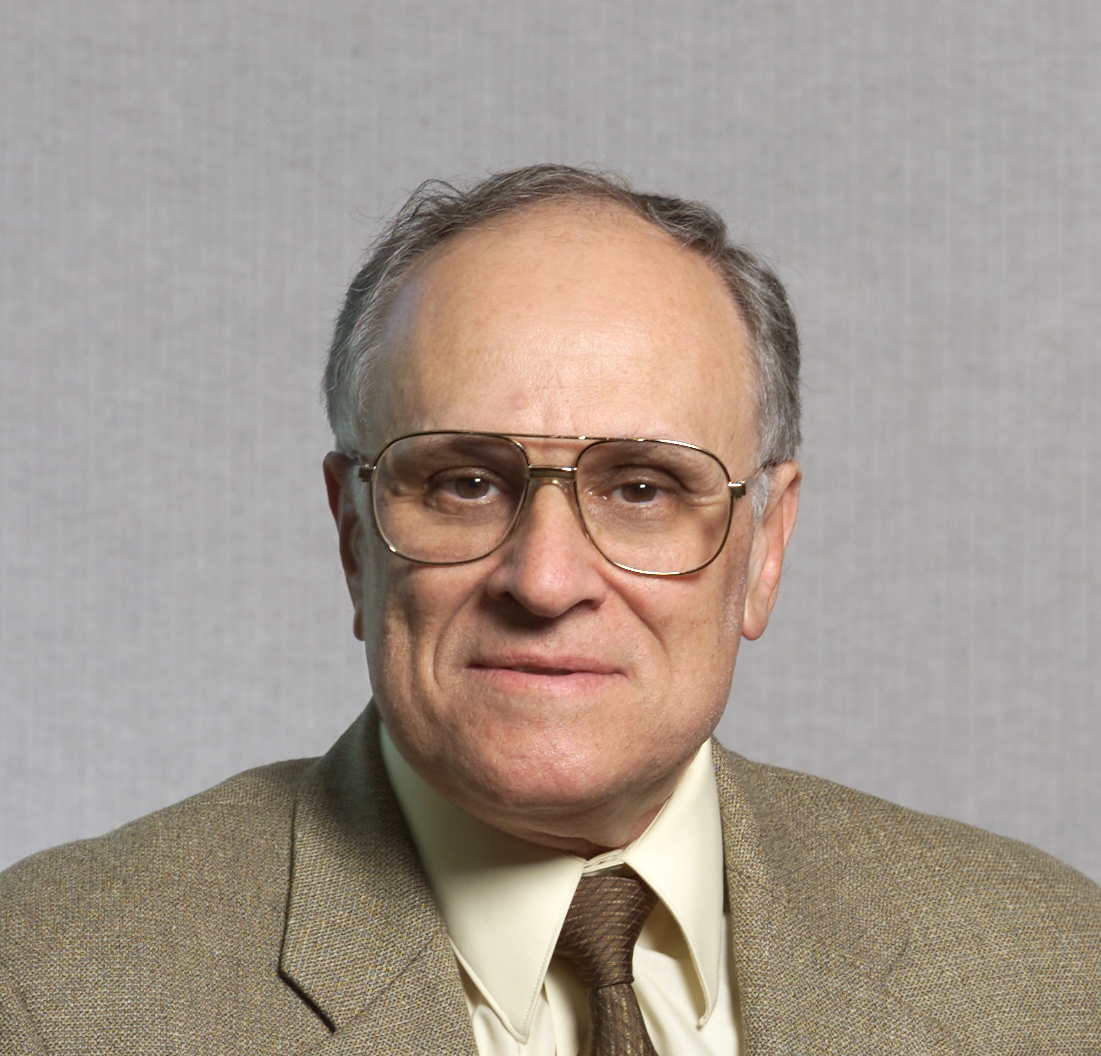
- IEEE Alexander Graham Bell Medal recipient
- Born: February 28, 1940; Jersey City, New Jersey, U.S.
- Died: September 17, 2023, Sayreville, United States
- Education: New Jersey Institute of Technology; New York University; Stevens Institute of Technology
- Awards: IEEE Fellow; IEEE Eric E. Sumner Award (2004); IEEE Alexander Graham Bell Medal (2008)
- Scientific career
- Fields: Mathematics, telecommunications
- Workplaces: Bell Labs
- Doctoral advisor: Lawrence J. Wallen

Gerard Joseph Foschini (February 28, 1940 - September 17, 2023) was an American telecommunications engineer who worked for Bell Laboratories from 1961 until his retirement. His research has covered many kinds of data communications, particularly Wireless communications and optical communications. Foschini has also worked on point-to-point systems and networks.

== Biography ==
Foschini received the B.S.E.E. degree from the New Jersey Institute of Technology, the M.E.E. degree from New York University and a Ph.D. (1967) from the Stevens Institute of Technology. In December 1962, he joined AT&T Bell Laboratories, where he has worked since. He has also taught at Princeton University and Rutgers University.

Within the telecommunications engineering field, he is best known for his invention of Bell Laboratories Layered Space-Time (BLAST), one of the first developments in MIMO (multiple input, multiple output) wireless technology. This wireless communications scheme recommends the use of multiple antennas at both the transmitter and receiver. By careful allocation of the data to be transmitted to the transmitting antennas, multiple data streams can be transmitted simultaneously within a single frequency band — the data capacity of the system then grows directly in line with the number of antennas. This represents a significant advance on single-antenna systems.

Foschini's 1996 paper, not published until 1998, "On limits of wireless communications in a fading environment when using multiple antennas",^{[1]} played a key role advancing multiple-input multiple-output wireless systems. Shortly after that publication, in a technical memorandum for his employers,^{[2]} Foschini introduced the BLAST concept, which is one of the most widely examined techniques in wireless communications research today. Among his later contributions, the paper offering a simplified form of the original BLAST architecture, called Vertical BLAST (V-BLAST),^{[3]} has also resulted in intensive international research efforts. In 2002, Bell Laboratories' patent on BLAST was named by MIT's Technology Review Magazine as one of five "Patents to watch". According to the Institute for Scientific Information Foschini is in the top 0.3% of most-cited authors. His papers have been cited over 50,000 times, resulting in an H-index of 63 and an i10-index of 114.

In 2002, Foschini received the Thomas Alva Edison Patent Award, an honor given to people from New Jersey who have changed the world with their inventions; he has also received the Bell Labs Inventor's Award, Gold Award and Teamwork Award and holds the titles of "Distinguished Member of Staff, Distinguished Inventor" in the Laboratories. Before his work on BLAST, Foschini had already been elected a fellow of the Institute of Electrical and Electronics Engineers in 1986, "for contributions to communications theory".

Foschini received the 2008 IEEE Alexander Graham Bell Medal "For seminal contributions to the science and technology of multiple-antenna wireless communications." And the IEEE Eric E. Sumner Award in 2006. Also in 2008 he received the New Jersey Institute of Technology Alumni Achievement Honor Roll Award and the IEEE Communication Theory Committee Technical Achievement Award. On March 28, 2015, he received the Stevens Technology Distinguished Alumni Award for Engineering, and is part of the Stevens Institute of Technology top 150 in 150 years.

In 2018, Foschini was honored as an NJIT magazine Top Influencer from the Institution.

In 2009, Foschini was elected to the National Academy of Engineering.

On September 17, 2023 Foschini died after suffering from Parkinson's disease for several years.

== Publications ==
1. Gerard. J. Foschini; Michael. J. Gans (1998). "On limits of wireless communications in a fading environment when using multiple antennas" (PDF). Wireless Personal Communications. 6 (3): 311–335. doi:10.1023/A:1008889222784. S2CID 6157164. Archived from the original (PDF) on 2005-05-11.
2. Gerard. J. Foschini (1996). "Layered Space-Time Architecture for Wireless Communication in a Fading Environment When Using Multi-Element Antennas" (PDF). Bell Labs Technical Journal. October: 41–59. Archived from the original (PDF) on 2022-02-21.
3. Gerard J. Foschini; Glen D. Golden; Reinaldo A. Valenzuela; Peter W. Wolniansky (1999). "Simplified Processing for High Spectral Efficiency Wireless Communication Employing Multi-Element Arrays". IEEE Journal on Selected Areas in Communications. 17 (11): 1841–1852. CiteSeerX 10.1.1.421.9166. doi:10.1109/49.806815.
4. Gerard J. Foschini; Z. Miljanic (1993). "A simple distributed autonomous power control algorithm and its convergence" (PDF). IEEE Transactions on Vehicular Technology. 42 (4). Archived from the original (PDF) on 2016-03-05.

Awards
Preceded by Norman Abramson	IEEE Alexander Graham Bell Medal; 2008	Succeeded by Robert McEliece
