= Visual MIMO =

Optical communication system

Visual MIMO is an optical communication system. The name is derived from MIMO, where the multiple transmitter multiple receiver model has been adopted for light in the visible and non-visible spectrum. In Visual MIMO, a LED or electronic visual display serves as the transmitter, while a camera serves as the receiver.
