= T. Russell Shields =

American entrepreneur

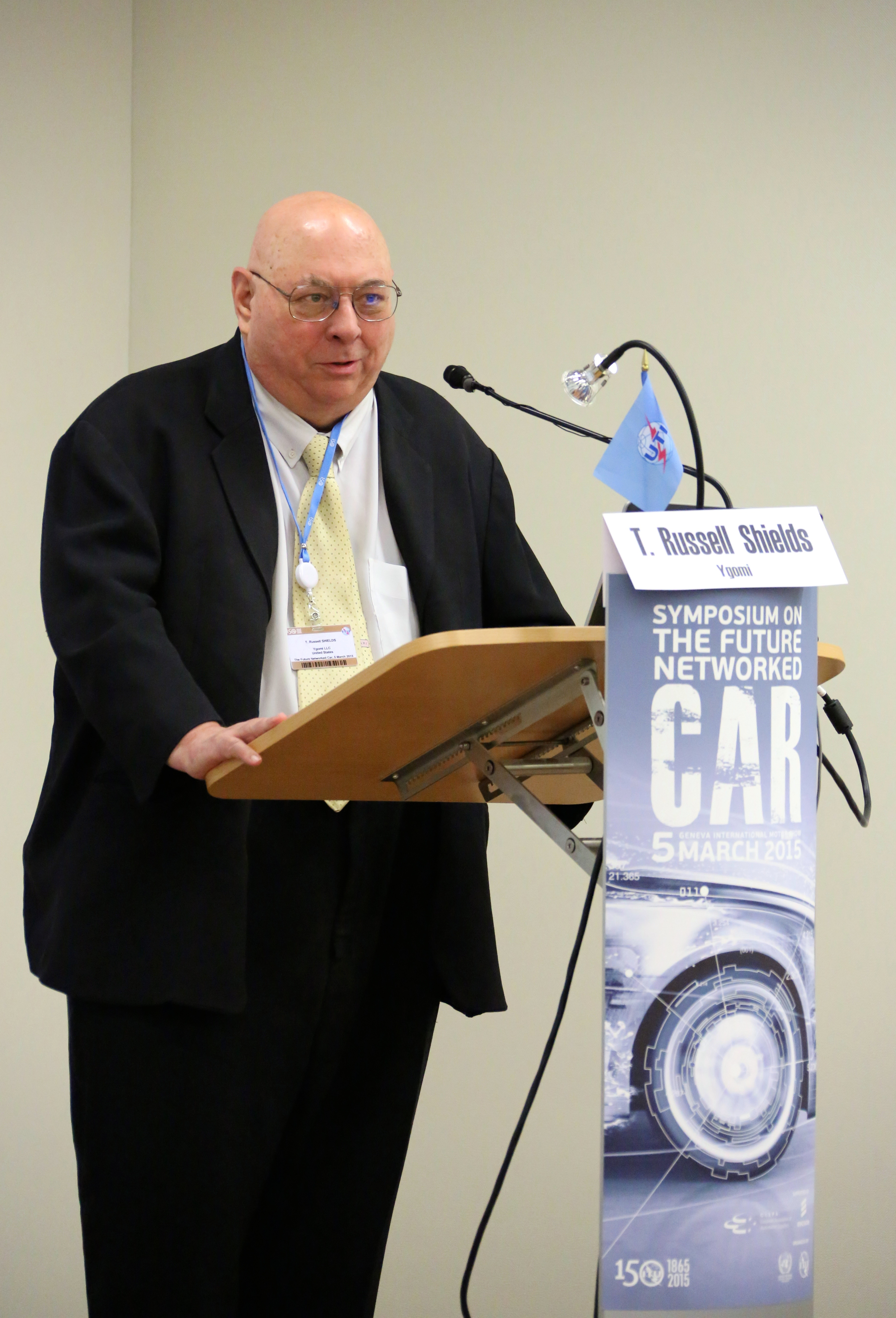
- Shields in 2015 at the Geneva Motor Show
- Education: Wichita State (BS in mathematics), MA in history and MBA from the University of Chicago
- Occupation: Entrepreneur
- Known for: Leading multiple startups, most notably Cellular Business Services, Inc. and Navteq; decades-long leadership in technology standards for the intelligent transportation systems (ITS) industry

T. Russell Shields is an American entrepreneur who is known for investing in and leading Navteq to profitability and selling it in 2007 to Nokia. He was Chair of Ygomi LLC and President and CEO of RoadDB.

Businesses that Shields has led over the last five decades include Shields Enterprises International, Cellular Business Systems, Inc. (later Convergys), Navigation Technologies (later Navteq, now HERE), ArrayComm, Connexis, and SEI.

Shields Enterprises International, which Shields founded in Chicago in 1969, has developed several data management and transaction processing systems, including fundamental systems for the United States Veterans Administration, Social Security Administration, and Central Intelligence Agency.

Cellular Business Systems, Inc. (CBSI) was the first company to provide billing services to the U.S. cell phone industry.

Navigation Technologies pioneered the development of comprehensive, navigable map database and routing tools. Shields was CEO until 2000, as a board member until 2004, and as an adviser to the CEO until 2008.

Shields has been involved in communications standards bodies for nearly 40 years. He was a founder of the organization that became the Cellular Telecommunications and Internet Association (CTIA) and was the President of the Automotive Multimedia Interface Collaboration (AMI‑C). He did two terms as Chair of the Committee on Communications of the Transportation Research Board (National Research Council of the National Academies of Sciences, Engineering, and Medicine). Shields was Convenor of the international working group developing standards for vehicle-vehicle and vehicle-infrastructure communications (ISO/TC204/WG16). He is currently Chair of the Collaboration on ITS Communication Standards of the International Telecommunication Union, the United Nations specialized agency for information and communications technology (ICT), as well as ITU representative to the UNECE World Forum for Harmonization of Vehicle Regulations (WP.29). Shields is a member of the National Space-Based Positioning, Navigation and Timing Advisory Board, an American presidential commission.

Shields was also a founding officer and director of ITS America. He was a founder of the World Congress on Intelligent Transport Systems and is a member of its board of directors. Shields sat on or chaired multiple committees of SAE International. He received the 1998 SAE‑Delco Electronics Intelligent Transportation Systems Award for distinguished service to the ITS industry, and was named an SAE Fellow in 2007. Shields was inducted into the inaugural class of ITS America’s ITS Hall of Fame in 2008, and was named the inaugural U.S. member of the ITS World Congress Hall of Fame in 2010.

He was the recipient of the 2008 Distinguished Alumni Award in the category of Entrepreneurship from the Chicago Graduate School of Business.

Shields graduated from Hotchkiss Preparatory School in 1959. He later received a BS in mathematics from Wichita State and an MA (history) and MBA from the University of Chicago.
