= Radio channel emulator =

Air interface tool

Radio channel emulators or radio channel simulators (also called fading simulators) are tools for air interface testing in wireless communication. In a test environment, radio channel emulators replace the real-world radio channel between a radio transmitter and a receiver by providing a faded representation of a transmitted signal to the receiver inputs. As technology moves forward to take advantage of more complex channel characteristics such as MIMO, the channel modeling needed to accurately emulate the radio environment becomes even more critical to a test setup. Radio channel emulators enable creation of mathematical models representing the physical radio signal transmission medium.

== Typical use cases ==
=== MIMO Testing ===
The complex nature of a MIMO system creates unique measurement challenges in order to provide a test environment that fully simulates a real-world wireless channel. The radio channel emulator must have channel models that accurately simulate multiple antenna performance, including correlation between antenna elements.

== See also ==
- Fading
- Channel model
