= Björn Ottersten =

Swedish electrical engineer

- Born: 1961 (age 64–65); Stockholm, Sweden
- Education: Stanford University; Linköping University
- Known for: Space-division multiple access, MIMO
- Awards: 2025 IEEE Fourier Technical Field Award; 2024 Royal Swedish Academy of Engineering Sciences, Fellow; 2024 Appointed Chevalier de l'Ordre Grand-Ducal de la Couronne de Chêne (Knight of the Grand Ducal Order of the Oak Crown) by H.R.H. the Grand Duke; 2017 Recipient of a second Advanced Research Grant from European Research Council (ERC); 2014 Cedergren Medal, H.T. Cedergren Foundation for outstanding contributions to electrical engineering; 2013 Best Paper Award, IEEE Signal Processing Society Signal Processing Letters; 2011 Technical Achievement Award, IEEE Signal Processing Society for contributions in array signal processing and wireless communication; 2010 Meritorious Service Award, EURASIP; 2009 A first recipient of the European Research Council Advanced Research Grant; 2004 IEEE Fellow for contributions to antenna signal processing and wireless communications; 2001 Co-author of paper awarded IEEE Signal Processing Society Paper Award; 1993 IEEE Signal Processing Society Paper Award
- Scientific career
- Fields: Array Signal Processing, Wireless Communication
- Workplaces: University of Luxembourg, KTH Royal Institute of Technology
- Doctoral advisor: Thomas Kailath
- Website: wwwen.uni.lu/snt/people/bjoern_ottersten

Björn Ottersten (born 1961) is a Swedish educator, researcher, and electrical engineer who is the co-inventor of Space/Spatial Division Multiple Access (SDMA) technology. He has made contributions in array signal processing and wireless communications and has received many notable awards in these areas. Currently, he is a Professor of Signal Processing at Royal Institute of Technology (KTH), Stockholm, Sweden, and the founding director of the Interdisciplinary Centre for Security, Reliability and Trust, at University of Luxembourg, Luxembourg.

== Early life and education ==
Ottersten received the M.S. degree in electrical engineering and applied physics from Linköping University, Linköping, Sweden, in 1986. In 1989, he received the Ph.D. degree in electrical engineering from Stanford University, Stanford, CA. His advisor at Stanford was Thomas Kailath.

== Career ==
Ottersten is a Fellow of the IEEE and EURASIP.

From 2012, Ottersten has been an advisor to the European Commission, serving as the European Digital Champion of Luxembourg.

== Other activities ==
- European Research Council (ERC), Member of the Scientific Council (since 2023)
- Swedish Research Council, Member of the Board
- EURASIP Journal on Advances in Signal Processing, Editor-in-Chief
