= Per-user unitary rate control =

Per-user unitary rate control (PU^{2}RC) is a multi-user MIMO (multiple-input and multiple-output) scheme. PU^{2}RC uses both transmission pre-coding and multi-user scheduling. By doing that, the network capacity is further enhanced than the capacity of the single-user MIMO scheme.

- Background technologies: A single-user MIMO was initially developed to improve the spectral efficiency of point-to-point wireless transmission link. A multi-user MIMO was developed for cellular systems where the base station simultaneously communicates with multiple users.
- Principle: The concept of Per-User Unitary Rate Control (PU^{2}RC) was proposed in US Patent No. 7,324,480, Mobile communication apparatus and method including base station and mobile station having multi-antenna by James S. Kim, Kwang Bok Lee, Kiho Kim and Changsoon Park.

Recently, PU^{2}RC has been adopted in the IEEE 802.16m system description documentation (SDD) and the concept of this scheme was included in 3GPP LTE standard.

== Technology ==
Per-user unitary rate control (PU^{2}RC) is a practical multi-user MIMO solution. PU^{2}RC allows a base station to transmit different data streams to multiple users simultaneously. The base station selects target users from candidate users based on the information fed by users. Transmission data are multiplied by a pre-coding matrix selected from the set of predefined matrices before transmission. The selection of a pre-coding matrix is determined based on the information provided by users. The selection of both target users and a pre-coding matrix according to the information provided by mobiles enables the utilization of multi-user diversity and data multiplexing at the same time. Moreover, using predefined precoding matrices reduces feedback overhead from users to the base station. Pre-coding matrices used in this scheme is unitary. The use of unitary pre-coding matrices facilitates the estimation of interference from other users' data to the unintended user.

== Mathematical description ==
The operation of PU^{2}RC is mathematically described for the transmitter and receiver sides, respectively.

=== Base station ===
It is assumed that the base station employs $N_t$ transmission antennas. The $N_t \times 1$ transmission signal vector is given by

$$\mathbf{x} = \sum_{i=1}^K \mathbf{w}_i P_i s_i$$

where $\mathbf{w}_i$ is the $N_t \times 1$ linear precoding vector. PU^{2}RC generates $\mathbf{w}_i$ based on the received finite channel status information, which is delivered to the base station from the user equipment (UE) through uplink feedback signaling. The feedback signal consists of index in a look-up table of a precoding codebook.

=== Receiver side ===
Every receiver has a receive antenna array with $N_r$ elements. The receive signal vector at user $k (=1,2,\ldots,K)$ is modeled as follows:

$$\mathbf{y}_k = \mathbf{H}_k\mathbf{x}+\mathbf{n}_k$$

where $\mathbf{y}_k$ and $\mathbf{n}_k$ are the $N_r \times 1$ received symbol and noise, respectively, and $\mathbf{H}_k$ is the $N_r \times N_t$ matrix with the channel coefficients.

=== Throughput performance ===
The figure illustrates the throughput advantage of PU^{2}RC over the conventional single-user and no scheduling scheme, assuming that the codebook size is one, i.e., $(G=1)$. For larger codebook sizes the performance can be better than the performance of the unit-size codebook. Because of codebook-based multi-user scheduling, PU^{2}RC outperforms the conventional single-user and no scheduling scheme when the number of users is larger than one. Note that the performance plotted in the figure for the two systems were obtained assuming linear receiver.

== See also ==
- Multiple-input multiple-output communications
- Multi-user MIMO as the advanced MIMO communication technology
- Precoding
- Spatial multiplexing
