= Lively (company) =

American telecommunications company

- Company Type: Connected Health
- Founded: 2005
- Founder: Arlene Harris
- Headquarters: United States
- Parent: Best Buy
- Website: shop.lively.com

Lively (stylized as Live!y, and known before 2021 as GreatCall) is a connected health technology company based in the United States of America.

Since 2018, the company has been a subsidiary of electronics retailer Best Buy. Lively offers health and safety products and services for older adults, including mobile devices, cellular service, mobile apps and a wearable device. The company provides US-wide cellular service as a mobile virtual network operator (MVNO) through the Verizon Wireless network. The Lively Smart phone requires a data plan at an additional fee and those data services begin with a nominal fee and increases with options.

== History ==
GreatCall, Inc. Logo

GreatCall was founded in 2005 by Arlene Harris to provide aging adults with accessible technology and services. In the same year, the company launched the original Jitterbug phone.

In 2009, the company launched Live Nurse (now Urgent Care). In partnership with FONEMED, it provides customers with access to registered nurses 24 hours a day.

Also in 2009, the company acquired Massachusetts-based venture MobiWatch, Inc., for its mobile Personal Emergency Response (mPERS) intellectual property.

In 2011, GreatCall added the app MedCoach, which provides daily medication management. That same year, it introduced the 5Star Urgent Response (now known as GreatCall Splash), a mobile Personal Emergency Response System device, along with 5Star Medical Alert System, which uses GPS technology and advanced location analysis to connect users with emergency certified 5Star Agents.

In 2012, the company released the Jitterbug Touch, a keyboarded Android phone with a simplified user interface.

In 2014, the company added an alerting app, Link.

In November 2015, the firm acquired Lively Inc.

Lively, prior to being acquired, had developed an online software platform for caregivers to get alerts about pill dispensers and other items through a sensor system, allowing for the tracking of activity, diet, sleep, and movement.

In 2017, Great Call had around 800,000 subscribers in the United States for its mobile services. It generated roughly $250 million in annual revenue, and employed around 1,000 workers, with around 700 of those worker in call centers in Nevada. On June 7, 2017, GreatCall announced that it was being acquired by the private equity firm GTCR. The price was undisclosed. CEO David Inns remained with the company, as did other Great Call executives.

In turn, GreatCall was acquired by electronics retailer Best Buy on August 15, 2018, for $800 million. GreatCall's CEO became Best Buy Health's president of active aging.

In May 2021, the company renamed itself Lively, taking the name of the company it had acquired in 2015. Lively became available on Apple Watch in 2021.

Its Jitterbug Flip network experienced a network disruption at the start of 2023, with Best Buy stating that Jitterbug Flip2 phones, Jitterbug smartphones, and Lively-branded phones weren't impacted. Verizon is the 3G provider for Lively, and the network issues followed Verizon's retirement of its 3G mobile network.

== Products and services ==
The company operates the Lively phone service, an MVNO, or mobile virtual network operator, where it rents cellular service from other operators, and primarily caters to seniors with old-fashioned phones and medical alert devices.

Lively manufactures the Jitterbug Flip phones, an easy-to-use cell phone marketed for American elderly.

The brand's Urgent Response Center offers medical advice, as well as prescriptions and refills.

== Awards and recognitions ==
- In 2006, the Jitterbug cell phone was recognized in New York Times tech journalist David Pogue's Top 10 Brilliant Ideas and Reader's Digest 100 Best Products.
- In 2007, the company won the Wireless industry's Andrew Seybold Choice Award for "Best New Wireless Company" at CTIA, the Cellular Telecommunications and Internet Associations design award, and was recognized as a finalist for CES's Last Gadget Standing Competition.
- In 2008, it received the Stevie Award for "Best Overall Company", the American Society on Aging's Award for "Best Small Business".
- In 2009, TripleTree selected GreatCall as the winner for "Best Consumer Experience" and GreatCall's LiveNurse application (now Urgent Care) received the CTIA Hot for the Holiday's "Hottest Mobile Consumer Application" award. In 2010, LiveNurse also received the CTIA Hot for the Holiday's "Hottest Mobile Consumer Application" award.
- In 2014, the company Link app won the Today's Caregiver's "Caregiver Friendly Award".
- In 2016, the Lively Wearable was recognized in The Wall Street Journal's "Best Of CES 2016: The Wondrous and Wacky Year Ahead in Gadgets".
- In 2016, the Jitterbug Flip was featured in the Wall Street Journal article on simple phones and was the editor's phone of the lot. The same year, it was also recognized in PCMag as Editor's Choice for simple cell phones.

== See also ==
- List of California companies
- List of United States wireless communications service providers
- List of United States MVNOs
- Page Plus Cellular
