= Retrodirectivity =

Directing a signal back toward a source

A retrodirective antenna is an antenna that transmits the signal back in the same direction it came from. This is based on the principle of self-phase conjugation of the input signal. Directivity depends on relative phases of signal radiated from different elements. Arrayed antenna consist of multiple, identical radiating elements.

Retrodirectivity can be achieved entirely passively with the use of a van Atta array.

Retrodirectivity can also be achieved with phase conjugation by geometric placement of antenna elements (also known as heterodyning). Phase conjugation is obtained by mixing with LO (local oscillator) frequencies twice that of the incoming signal.

== Applications ==
Using retrodirectivity allows for faster acquisition (up to twelve times faster) than phased array antennas, and with up to twenty-five times the power output.

The key advantages of retrodirective antennas over phased array antennas are less signal processing time and faster response times.
