= Arogyaswami Paulraj =

Indian-American engineer

Arogyaswami J. Paulraj
- Born: 14 April 1944 (age 82); Pollachi, Madras Presidency, British India
- Education: National Defence Academy, Indian Institute of Technology Delhi
- Known for: MIMO wireless technology
- Awards: Royal Academy of Engineering, Prince Philip Medal (2024), IET Faraday Medal (2023), US Patent Office-National Inventors Hall of Fame (2018), Marconi Society-Marconi Prize (2014), IEEE Alexander Graham Bell Medal (2011), Govt. of India-Padma Bhushan (2010)
- Scientific career
- Fields: Wireless Communications, Signal Processing, Sonar Systems
- Workplaces: Stanford University

Arogyaswami J. Paulraj (born 14 April 1944) is an Indian electrical engineer who is a professor emeritus in the Department of Electrical Engineering at Stanford University. He is best known for his work in MIMO (Multiple Input, Multiple Output) wireless technology.

== Early life ==
Paulraj was born in Pollachi, near Coimbatore, British India, in 1944. He attended Montfort Boys' High School in Yercaud, India.

He joined the National Defence Academy, Khadakvasla, as a cadet in 1961 and was commissioned in the Indian Navy in 1965. Paulraj was deputed to IIT Delhi, for a two-years (1969–1971), and developed a unified estimation theory for diffusion signals corrupted by Gaussian noise using tools from Itô stochastic calculus. He received his Ph.D. degree in 1973. His thesis work had little practical application due to computability of stochastic integrals.

== Career in India ==
From 1972 to 1974, Paulraj led a team at Indian Institute of Technology, Delhi, to redesign the British-origin Anti-Submarine Sonar Type 170B fitted on Indian Navy warships. The new design sonar was deployed in the Indian fleet. From 1977 to 1983, he led the development of APSOH, a large surface ship panoramic sonar that was widely deployed in the Indian Fleet.

Paulraj was a visiting scholar at Loughborough University, UK, from 1974 to 1975, and later at Stanford University, USA from 1983 to 1986. While at Stanford, he invented the ESPRIT algorithm for high-resolution parameter estimation. There are over 90,000 research papers building on his invention.

Between 1987 and 1991, Paulraj served as the founder or co-founder of three national labs for the Indian Government: Centre for Artificial Intelligence and Robotics, Central Research Laboratories for Bharat Electronics, Ministry of Defence, Center for Development of Advanced Computing, Ministry of Electronics and Information Technology.

In 1991, Paulraj, a Naval Commodore, took early retirement from the Indian Navy and departed India, moving to the USA.

== Career in the US ==
In 1991, Paulraj joined Stanford as a Research Associate and was later appointed Professor (Research) in 1993. Soon after arriving at Stanford, he proposed the technique now known as MIMO (Multiple Input, Multiple Output), which boosts data rates by transmitting parallel spatial streams. MIMO faced significant skepticism both from research agencies, as well as the industry. But MIMO went on to fundamentally transform wireless technology. His 1992 patent, named Thomas Kailath, his supervisor, as a co-inventor. The patent initially highlighted broadcast TV as an application while also discussing its use in mobile wireless communications.

At Stanford, Paulraj led the Smart Antennas Research Group until his retirement in 2010. His group, the largest in MIMO wireless in the 1990s, organized an annual workshop on the topic until 2004. He and his students authored the first textbook on MIMO wireless and along with his co-workers at his startups, contributed over 300 research publications and co-invented 154 patents.

Paulraj founded the first two companies to develop and commercialize MIMO technology:

- Iospan Wireless (1998–2003): Developed a cellular wireless system combining MIMO with OFDM modulation. This MIMO-OFDMA technology, designed for fixed/nomadic access, became the foundational architecture for modern 4G/5G and Wi-Fi networks. After the DOT-Com bubble, raising additional venture financing became difficult, and Iospan's assets were acquired by Intel Corp. in 2003, which used the technology to launch its global 4G WiMAX initiative.
- Beceem Communications (2004–2010): Developed 4G WiMAX modem semiconductors, capturing 65% of the global market share before being acquired by Broadcom Corp. to build its 4G LTE business.

Following his retirement from Stanford and two decades of work in MIMO, Paulraj continued his entrepreneurial activities. In 2014, he founded Rasa Networks to develop tools incorporating data science to support IT teams that manage large WiFi networks. Rasa was acquired by HPE in 2016 and its technology integrated with Aruba/HPE WiFi products.

=== Advisory roles ===
Beyond his primary research and entrepreneurial ventures, Paulraj has served as a consultant, advisor, and board member for companies and venture firms in the US, Israel, and India, including serving as a senior advisor to Broadcom Corp., and Celesta Capital He has served on the board the Marconi Society. Paulraj has advised governments on technology policy. For example, he currently works with the Indian Government on its initiative to build a semiconductor and systems industry in the country.

== Awards and recognitions ==
- Royal Academy of Engineering: The Prince Philip Medal
- Institution of Engineering and Technology: Faraday Medal
- US Patent Office - National Inventors Hall of Fame (USA): Inductee
- Marconi Society: Marconi Prize and Fellowship
- IEEE: Alexander Graham Bell Medal
- Government of India: Padma Bhushan
- Vishisht Seva Medal
- Ati Vishisht Seva Medal
- Scientist of the Year (by DRDO) in 1984
- Distinguished Alumnus Award from IIT Delhi in 1998

=== National Academies and Fellowships ===
- Member, American Academy of Arts and Sciences
- Wireless History Foundation: Hall of Fame Inductee
- Foreign Member, Chinese Academy of Engineering
- Member, United States National Academy of Engineering
- Foreign Member, Royal Swedish Academy of Engineering Sciences
- Honorary Fellow, Indian Academy of Sciences
- Fellow, The World Academy of Sciences
- Foreign Fellow, Indian National Academy of Engineering
- Distinguished Vaibhav Fellowship, Govt. of India
