= ADA (smart antenna) =

Advanced smart antenna

ADA (an abbreviation of adaptive antenna) is an advanced smart antenna, using multichannel controlled reception pattern antenna (CRPA), designed for various platforms, including UAVs, planes and ships, manufactured by the MLM factory of the Israeli Aerospace Industries (IAI).

The ADA enables vehicles, missiles and other platforms equipped with the smart antenna to navigate even when heavy jamming is conducted in order to block all reception of GPS and other GNSS signals. Using advanced techniques even very faint "good" signals are being extracted from the superposition of incoming waves that include noise and strong signals produced by the enemy (or friendly) jammers. These signals are then used (just like a regular GPS receiver) to triangulate the position and determine the GPS tune.

== History ==
The theory of the ADA started to emerge as a theory of multichannel estimation. Its origins go back into methods developed in the 1920s that were used to determine direction of the arrival of radio signals by a set of two antennas based on the phase difference or amplitudes of their output voltages. Thus, the assessment of the directions of arrival of a single signal was conducted according to pointed type indicator readings or according to the Lissajous curves, drawn by beam on the oscilloscope screen.

The existence of ADA was publicly unveiled in February 2017, along with a report that the Israeli Defence Forces has already decided to install the ADAs on "major platforms" in service. It was also displayed in the Aero India air show that was held from 14th to the 18th that month in Bangalore.

In July 2017 MLM has signed a contract with American Honeywell to jointly develop a GPS anti-jam navigation system, based on ADA and Honywell's devices.
