= Van Atta array =

Passive retrodirective phased array antenna

A Van Atta array is a type of passive retrodirective phased array antenna which redirects (rather than reflects) a signal back in the direction from which it came. It was first described by Lester C. Van Atta in his 1959 patent.

The signal can be modulated by the redirecting host for purposes such as radio-frequency identification and traffic control (radar target echo enhancement).

A 2023 paper describes the extension of the van Atta antenna principle to underwater acoustic communication.

== See also ==
- Retroreflector
