= ArrayComm =

ArrayComm LLC
- Company type: Private
- Industry: Mobile Broadband; Mobile Radio
- Founded: 1992
- Founders: Martin Cooper, Richard Roy
- Headquarters: Chicago, Illinois; United States
- Key people: Martin Cooper, Chairman Emeritus; T. Russell Shields, Principal; Paul Barnard, President
- Products: The Physical layer for 4G/5G cellular basestations
- Number of employees: 80 (2019)
- Website: www.arraycomm.com

ArrayComm is a wireless communications software company founded in San Jose, California. Co-founded in 1992 by Martin Cooper, a pioneer of the wireless industry. The company is wholly owned by Ygomi LLC, under principal investor T. Russell Shields. The current headquarters is Buffalo Grove, Illinois.

ArrayComm sells the physical layer (PHY) for 4G/5G wireless systems, as well as multi-antenna signal processing software for specific components of 4G PHYs using Smart Antennas and MIMO techniques. Patent-licensing is another source of revenue. The company's hardware was sold in Australia and South Africa under the iBurst brand name which continues to be owned by Kyocera. ArrayComm also traded in Asia by selling base-station software for Personal Handy-phone System (PHS) base-stations.

== Executive timeline ==
Name	Position	Served
Paul Barnard	President	09/2011–Present
Bruce Duysen	President	09/2008 - 09/2011
Stephen Sifferman	President	03/2005 - 09/2008
Clarence "Sam" Endy	Chief Executive Officer	02/2002 - 03/2005
Martin Cooper	Chief Executive Officer	04/1992 - 02/2002
Karl Martersteck	President	04/1995 - 06/1997

== Alumni group ==
Since inception, the company has had a large contingent of employees who have maintained close contact with each other owing to the paucity of companies in the mobile wireless space. Initially this group was hosted by Yahoo, though more recently it has been reestablished on Facebook group for social networking and as a LinkedIn for business networking.
