= Space-division multiple access =

Channel-access method in communications

Space-division multiple access (SDMA) is a technique to enhance the capacity of mobile and WiFi networks that use a base station hub (access point) to serve multiple users by dividing the physical space between users. The technique is often called a Multi-User (MU) technique, wherein multiple users in an MU group can simultaneously be supported on forward and reverse links within the same frequency and time resource. MU increases the capacity of wireless networks by the number of users in the MU group.

MU technology exploits differences in spatial signatures of the different users in the MU group to transmit and receive signals to and from the users. This requires receive adaptive beamforming, to pass the signal from the desired user and cancel the signals from the other users, avoiding mutual interference between users. Likewise, it needs transmit adaptive beamforming, which delivers the intended signal to the desired user and steers nulls toward the other users, to avoid interference.

The technique was first studied by Beach et al. from University of Bristol in 1998, who called the technique SDMA. In the absence of multipath, the users in the MU group need to be well separated in angle, as observed by the base station array, to ensure sufficiently different spatial signatures. In the presence of rich multipath, the users need less physical separation.

In 1992, R. Roy and others founded ArrayComm Inc. with Marty Cooper as Board Chairman, to commercialize the SDMA technique originally proposed by Beach. The company successfully developed MU technology for the Japanese PHS Handy phone system in 1998, and the technology saw commercial deployment in Asia. In recent years, ArrayComm has changed its business model and builds modules for 4G and 5G base stations.

The Multi-User technique has been combined with MIMO and is known as Multi-User MIMO, wherein multiple data streams (layers) supported by MIMO are combined with multi-user support.

MU-MIMO is generally not used in most current 4G and 5G mobile developments due to several problems. It has been, however, used successfully in WiFi (11ax, ac) networks, delivering increased capacity from the MU dimension.

== See also ==
- Co-channel interference
- Multi-user MIMO (MU-MIMO)
- History of smart antennas
