= Don Torrieri =

American electrical engineer

Don J. Torrieri is an American electrical engineer and mathematician. His primary research interests are communication systems, adaptive arrays, and signal processing. He is a Fellow of the US Army Research Laboratory, where he was employed for most of his career. He has authored many articles and books including Principles of Spread-Spectrum Communication Systems, 5th edition (Springer, 2022). He has taught many graduate courses at Johns Hopkins University, Baltimore, Maryland and many short courses. Don Torrieri received the B.S. degree from the Massachusetts Institute of Technology, Cambridge, the MS. degree from the Polytechnic Institute of New York University, Farmingdale, and the Ph.D. degree in electrophysics from the University of Maryland, College Park.

His most important and most cited paper is Statistical Theory of Passive Location Systems. According to Google Scholar, this paper has been cited more than 2,000 times.

His most important and most cited book is Principles of Spread-Spectrum Communication Systems. According to Google Scholar, this book has been cited more than 700 times.

== Awards ==
His awards include the Best Paper Award of the 1991 IEEE Military Communications Conference. He received the Military Communications Conference achievement award for sustained contributions to the field in 2004. In 2014, he received the US Army Research Laboratory Publication Award.

== Books ==
Dr. Torrieri is the author of several books including Principles of Secure Communication Systems (Artech House, 2nd ed., 1992; 1st ed., 1985), Principles of Military Communication Systems (Artech House, 1981), and Principles of Spread-Spectrum Communication Systems ( Springer, 5th ed., 2022; 4th ed., 2018; 3rd ed., 2015; 2nd ed., 2011; 1st ed., 2005). He is also the author of many IEEE journal articles and many more conference papers, technical reports, and classified reports.
