= Bell Laboratories Layered Space-Time =

Bell Laboratories Layer Space-Time (BLAST) is a transceiver architecture for offering spatial multiplexing over multiple-antenna wireless communication systems. Such systems have multiple antennas at both the transmitter and the receiver in an effort to exploit the many different paths between the two in a highly-scattering wireless environment. BLAST was developed by Gerard Foschini at Lucent Technologies' Bell Laboratories (now Nokia Bell Labs). By careful allocation of the data to be transmitted to the transmitting antennas, multiple data streams can be transmitted simultaneously within a single frequency band — the data capacity of the system then grows directly in line with the number of antennas (subject to certain assumptions). This represents a significant advance on current, single-antenna systems.

== V-BLAST ==
V-BLAST (Vertical-Bell Laboratories Layered Space-Time) is a detection algorithm to the receipt of multi-antenna MIMO systems. Available for the first time in 1996 at Bell Laboratories in New Jersey in the United States by Gerard J. Foschini. He proceeded simply to eliminate interference caused successively issuers.

Its principle is quite simple: to make a first detection of the most powerful signal. It regenerates the received signal from this user from this decision. Then, the signal is regenerated subtracted from the received signal and, with this new signal, it proceeds to the detection of the second user's most powerful, since it has already cleared the first and so forth. What gives a vector containing received less interference.

The complete detection algorithm can be summarized as recursive as follows:

Initialize:

$$\begin{align}
i&\leftarrow 1 \\
r_1&=r \\
G_1&=(H^HH+\sigma ^2I_{N_t})^{-1}H^H \\
k_1&=\arg  \min \left \| (G_1)_j \right \|^2 \\
\end{align}$$

Recursive:

$$\begin{align}
w_k &= (G_i)_{ki} \\
y_k&=w^T_k\times r_i \\
\hat{s}_k&=sign(y_k) \\
r_{i+1}&=r_i-\hat{s}_k(H)_{ki} \\
G_{i+1}&=((H^H_iH_i)+\sigma^2I_{Nt})^{-1}H^H_i \\
k_{i+1}&=\arg \min \left\| (G_{i+1})_j \right\|^2 \\
i &\leftarrow  i+1
\end{align}$$

== See also ==
- Space–time code — a means for using multiple antennas to improve reliability rather than data-rate.
- Telecommunication
