= Smart antenna =

Antenna arrays with smart signal processing algorithms

Smart antennas (also known as adaptive array antennas, digital antenna arrays, multiple antennas and, recently, MIMO) are antenna arrays with smart signal processing algorithms used to identify spatial signal signatures such as the direction of arrival (DOA) of the signal, and use them to calculate beamforming vectors which are used to track and locate the antenna beam on the mobile/target. Smart antennas should not be confused with reconfigurable antennas, which have similar capabilities but are single element antennas and not antenna arrays.

Smart antenna techniques are used notably in acoustic signal processing, track and scan radar, radio astronomy and radio telescopes, and mostly in cellular systems like W-CDMA, UMTS, and LTE and 5G-NR.

Smart antennas have many functions: DOA estimation, beamforming, interference nulling, and constant modulus preservation.

== Direction of arrival (DOA) estimation ==
The smart antenna system estimates the direction of arrival of the signal, using techniques such as MUSIC (MUltiple SIgnal Classification), estimation of signal parameters via rotational invariance techniques (ESPRIT) algorithms, Matrix Pencil method or one of their derivatives. They involve finding a spatial spectrum of the antenna/sensor array, and calculating the DOA from the peaks of this spectrum. These calculations are computationally intensive.

Matrix Pencil is very efficient in case of real time systems, and under the correlated sources.

== Beamforming ==
Beamforming is the method used to create the radiation pattern of the antenna array by adding constructively the phases of the signals in the direction of the targets/mobiles desired, and nulling the pattern of the targets/mobiles that are undesired/interfering targets. This can be done with a simple Finite Impulse Response (FIR) tapped delay line filter. The weights of the FIR filter may also be changed adaptively, and used to provide optimal beamforming, in the sense that it reduces the Minimum Mean Square Error between the desired and actual beampattern formed. Typical algorithms are the steepest descent, and Least Mean Squares algorithms. In digital antenna arrays with multi channels, use the digital beamforming, usually by DFT or FFT.

== Types of smart antennas ==
Two of the main types of smart antennas include switched beam smart antennas and adaptive array smart antennas. Switched beam systems have several available fixed beam patterns. A decision is made as to which beam to access, at any given point in time, based upon the requirements of the system. Adaptive arrays allow the antenna to steer the beam to any direction of interest while simultaneously nulling interfering signals. Beamdirection can be estimated using the so-called direction-of-arrival (DOA) estimation methods.

In 2008, the United States NTIA began a major effort to assist consumers in the purchase of digital television converter boxes. Through this effort, many people have been exposed to the concept of smart antennas for the first time. In the context of consumer electronics, a "smart antenna" is one that conforms to the EIA/CEA-909 Standard Interface.

In 2017, the Israeli Aerospace Industries unveiled an adaptive array antenna called ADA, and stated that it is already operational and shall be fitted onto "major platforms" used by the Israel Defense Forces.

== Limited choice of EIA/CEA-909A smart antennas in the marketplace ==
Prior to the final transition to ATSC digital television in the United States on 11 June 2009, two smart antenna models were brought to market:

- RCA ANT2000 – no longer available from retailers
- DTA-5000 – manufactured by Funai Electric, marketed under the "DX Antenna" brand name, sometimes associated with the Sylvania brand name; no longer available from retailers

And two models are causing consumer confusion:

- Although the Apex SM550 is capable of connecting to a CEA-909 port for the purpose of drawing electrical power, it is not a true smart antenna.
- The Channel Master 3000A and CM3000HD SMARTenna series are otherwise-conventional amplified omnidirectional antennas, not steerable smart antennas.
- ADA - An adaptive antenna produced by MLM factory of the Israel Aerospace Industries

== See also ==
- Antenna (radio) – Device that transmits and receives radio waves
- Array processing – Area of research in signal processing
- History of smart antennas
- Phased array – Array of antennas creating a steerable beam
- CEA-909 – ANSI standard for 8VSB/ATSC smart antennas
- WiMAX – Wireless broadband standard
- Diversity combining – the combining of multiple received signals into a single improved signal
- Active antenna – Electric antennae
- Reconfigurable antenna – Antenna capable of modifying its frequency and radiation properties dynamically
- Digital antenna array – Smart antenna with multi channels digital beamforming
