= Beamforming =

Signal processing technique for sensor arrays

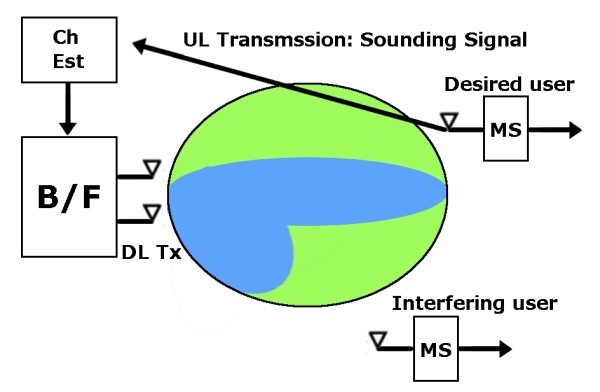

Beamforming or spatial filtering is a signal processing technique used in sensor arrays for directional signal transmission or reception. This is achieved by combining elements in an antenna array in such a way that signals at particular angles experience constructive interference while others experience destructive interference. Beamforming can be used at both the transmitting and receiving ends in order to achieve spatial selectivity. The improvement compared with omnidirectional reception/transmission is known as the directivity of the array.

Keysight's time delay digital beam forming machine at 9th Bengaluru Space Expo 2026, BIEC

Beamforming can be used for radio or sound waves. It has found numerous applications in radar, sonar, seismology, wireless communications, radio astronomy, acoustics and biomedicine. Adaptive beamforming is used to detect and estimate the signal of interest at the output of a sensor array by means of optimal (e.g., least-squares) spatial filtering and interference rejection.

== Techniques ==
To change the directionality of the array when transmitting, a beamformer controls the phase and relative amplitude of the signal at each transmitter, in order to create a pattern of constructive and destructive interference in the wavefront. When receiving, information from different sensors is combined in a way where the expected pattern of radiation is preferentially observed.

For example, in sonar, to send a sharp pulse of sound underwater towards a ship in the distance, simply simultaneously transmitting that sharp pulse from every sonar projector in an array fails because the ship will first hear the pulse from the speaker that happens to be nearest the ship, then later pulses from speakers that happen to be further from the ship. The beamforming technique involves sending the pulse from each projector at slightly different times (the projector closest to the ship last), so that every pulse hits the ship at exactly the same time, producing the effect of a single strong pulse from a single powerful projector. The same technique can be carried out in air using loudspeakers, or in radar/radio using antennas.

In passive sonar, and in reception in active sonar, the beamforming technique involves combining delayed signals from each hydrophone at slightly different times (the hydrophone closest to the target will be combined after the longest delay), so that every signal reaches the output at exactly the same time, making one loud signal, as if the signal came from a single, very sensitive hydrophone. Receive beamforming can also be used with microphones or radar antennas.

With narrowband systems the time delay is equivalent to a "phase shift", so in this case the array of antennas, each one shifted a slightly different amount, is called a phased array. A narrow band system, typical of radars, is one where the bandwidth is only a small fraction of the center frequency. With wideband systems this approximation no longer holds, which is typical in sonars.

In the receive beamformer the signal from each antenna may be amplified by a different "weight." Different weighting patterns (e.g., Dolph–Chebyshev) can be used to achieve the desired sensitivity patterns. A main lobe is produced together with nulls and sidelobes. As well as controlling the main lobe width (beamwidth) and the sidelobe levels, the position of a null can be controlled. This is useful to ignore noise or jammers in one particular direction, while listening for events in other directions. A similar result can be obtained on transmission.

For the full mathematics on directing beams using amplitude and phase shifts, see the mathematical section in phased array.

Beamforming techniques can be broadly divided into two categories:

- conventional (fixed or switched beam) beamformers
- adaptive beamformers or phased array
  - Desired signal maximization mode
  - Interference signal minimization or cancellation mode

Conventional beamformers, such as the Butler matrix, use a fixed set of weightings and time-delays (or phasings) to combine the signals from the sensors in the array, primarily using only information about the location of the sensors in space and the wave directions of interest. In contrast, adaptive beamforming techniques (e.g., MUSIC, SAMV) generally combine this information with properties of the signals actually received by the array, typically to improve rejection of unwanted signals from other directions. This process may be carried out in either the time or the frequency domain.

As the name indicates, an adaptive beamformer is able to automatically adapt its response to different situations. Some criterion has to be set up to allow the adaptation to proceed such as minimizing the total noise output. Because of the variation of noise with frequency, in wide band systems it may be desirable to carry out the process in the frequency domain.

Beamforming can be computationally intensive. Sonar phased array has a data rate low enough that it can be processed in real time in software, which is flexible enough to transmit or receive in several directions at once. In contrast, radar phased array has a data rate so high that it usually requires dedicated hardware processing, which is hard-wired to transmit or receive in only one direction at a time. However, newer field programmable gate arrays are fast enough to handle radar data in real time, and can be quickly re-programmed like software, blurring the hardware/software distinction.

== Sonar beamforming requirements ==
Sonar beamforming utilizes a similar technique to electromagnetic beamforming, but varies considerably in implementation details. Sonar applications vary from 1 Hz to as high as 2 MHz, and array elements may be few and large, or number in the hundreds yet very small. This will shift sonar beamforming design efforts significantly between demands of such system components as the "front end" (transducers, pre-amplifiers and digitizers) and the actual beamformer computational hardware downstream. High frequency, focused beam, multi-element imaging-search sonars and acoustic cameras often implement fifth-order spatial processing that places strains equivalent to Aegis radar demands on the processors.

Many sonar systems, such as on torpedoes, are made up of arrays of up to 100 elements that must accomplish beam steering over a 100 degree field of view and work in both active and passive modes.

Sonar arrays are used both actively and passively in 1-, 2-, and 3-dimensional arrays.

- 1-dimensional "line" arrays are usually in multi-element passive systems towed behind ships and in single- or multi-element side-scan sonar.
- 2-dimensional "planar" arrays are common in active/passive ship hull mounted sonars and some side-scan sonar.
- 3-dimensional spherical and cylindrical arrays are used in 'sonar domes' in the modern submarine and ships.

Sonar differs from radar in that in some applications such as wide-area-search all directions often need to be listened to, and in some applications broadcast to, simultaneously. Thus a multibeam system is needed. In a narrowband sonar receiver, the phases for each beam can be manipulated entirely by signal processing software, as compared to present radar systems that use hardware to 'listen' in a single direction at a time.

Sonar also uses beamforming to compensate for the significant problem of the slower propagation speed of sound as compared to that of electromagnetic radiation. In side-look-sonars, the speed of the towing system or vehicle carrying the sonar is moving at sufficient speed to move the sonar out of the field of the returning sound "ping". In addition to focusing algorithms intended to improve reception, many side scan sonars also employ beam steering to look forward and backward to "catch" incoming pulses that would have been missed by a single sidelooking beam.

== Schemes ==
- A conventional beamformer can be a simple beamformer also known as delay-and-sum beamformer. All the weights of the antenna elements can have equal magnitudes. The beamformer is steered to a specified direction only by selecting appropriate phases for each antenna. If the noise is uncorrelated and there are no directional interferences, the signal-to-noise ratio of a beamformer with $L$ antennas receiving a signal of power $P$, (where $\sigma_n^2$ is Noise variance or Noise power), is: $\frac{1}{\sigma_n^2}P\cdot L$
- A null-steering beamformer is optimized to have zero response in the direction of one or more interferers.
- A frequency-domain beamformer treats each frequency bin as a narrowband signal, for which the filters are complex coefficients (that is, gains and phase shifts), separately optimized for each frequency.

== Evolved beamformer ==
The delay-and-sum beamforming technique uses multiple microphones to localize sound sources. One disadvantage of this technique is that adjustments of the position or of the number of microphones changes the performance of the beamformer nonlinearly. Additionally, due to the number of combinations possible, it is computationally hard to find the best configuration. One of the techniques to solve this problem is the use of genetic algorithms. Such algorithm searches for the microphone array configuration that provides the highest signal-to-noise ratio for each steered orientation. Experiments showed that such algorithm could find the best configuration of a constrained search space comprising ~33 million solutions in a matter of seconds instead of days.

== History in wireless communication standards ==
Beamforming techniques used in cellular phone standards have advanced through the generations to make use of more complex systems to achieve higher density cells, with higher throughput.

- Passive mode: (almost) non-standardized solutions
  - Wideband code division multiple access (WCDMA) supports direction of arrival (DOA) based beamforming
- Active mode: mandatory standardized solutions
  - 2G – Transmit antenna selection as an elementary beamforming
  - 3G – WCDMA: transmit antenna array (TxAA) beamforming
  - 3G evolution – LTE/UMB: multiple-input multiple-output (MIMO) precoding based beamforming with partial space-division multiple access (SDMA)
  - Beyond 3G (4G, 5G...) – More advanced beamforming solutions to support SDMA such as closed-loop beamforming and multi-dimensional beamforming are expected

An increasing number of consumer 802.11ac Wi-Fi devices with MIMO capability can support beamforming to boost data communication rates.

== Digital, analog, and hybrid ==
To receive (but not transmit), there is a distinction between analog and digital beamforming. For example, if there are 100 sensor elements, the "digital beamforming" approach entails that each of the 100 signals passes through an analog-to-digital converter to create 100 digital data streams. Then these data streams are added up digitally, with appropriate scale-factors or phase-shifts, to get the composite signals. By contrast, the "analog beamforming" approach entails taking the 100 analog signals, scaling or phase-shifting them using analog methods, summing them, and then usually digitizing the single output data stream.

Digital beamforming has the advantage that the digital data streams (100 in this example) can be manipulated and combined in many possible ways in parallel, to get many different output signals in parallel. The signals from every direction can be measured simultaneously, and the signals can be integrated for a longer time when studying far-off objects and simultaneously integrated for a shorter time to study fast-moving close objects, and so on. This cannot be done as effectively for analog beamforming, not only because each parallel signal combination requires its own circuitry, but more fundamentally because digital data can be copied perfectly but analog data cannot. (There is only so much analog power available, and amplification adds noise.) Therefore, if the received analog signal is split up and sent into a large number of different signal combination circuits, it can reduce the signal-to-noise ratio of each.

In MIMO communication systems with large number of antennas, so called massive MIMO systems, the beamforming algorithms executed at the digital baseband can get very complex. In addition, if all beamforming is done at baseband, each antenna needs its own RF feed. At high frequencies and with large number of antenna elements, this can be very costly, and increase loss and complexity in the system. To remedy these issues, hybrid beamforming has been suggested where some of the beamforming is done using analog components and not digital.

There are many possible different functions that can be performed using analog components instead of at the digital baseband.

Beamforming, whether done digitally, or by means of analog architecture, has recently been applied in Integrated Sensing and Communication (ISAC), also known as Joint Communication and Sensing (JCAS), technology. For instance, a beamformer was suggested, in imperfect channel state information situations to perform communication tasks, while at the same time performing target detection to sense targets in the scene.

== For speech audio ==
Beamforming can be used to try to extract sound sources in a room, such as multiple speakers in the cocktail party problem. This requires the locations of the speakers to be known in advance, for example by using the time of arrival from the sources to mics in the array, and inferring the locations from the distances.

Compared to carrier-wave telecommunications, natural audio contains a variety of frequencies. It is advantageous to separate frequency bands prior to beamforming because different frequencies have different optimal beamform filters (and hence can be treated as separate problems, in parallel, and then recombined afterward). Properly isolating these bands involves specialized non-standard filter banks. In contrast, for example, the standard fast Fourier transform (FFT) band-filters implicitly assume that the only frequencies present in the signal are exact harmonics; frequencies which lie between these harmonics will typically activate all of the FFT channels (which is not what is wanted in a beamform analysis). Instead, filters can be designed in which only local frequencies are detected by each channel (while retaining the recombination property to be able to reconstruct the original signal), and these are typically non-orthogonal unlike the FFT basis.

== See also ==
- Antenna diversity – Redundancy method to improve communications reliability
- Aperture synthesis – Mixing signals from many telescopes to produce images with high angular resolution
- Channel state information – Known channel properties of a communication link
- Dirty paper coding (DPC) – Coding technique that can compensate for a known interference
- Golomb ruler – Set of marks along a ruler such that no two pairs of marks are the same distance apart
- MUSIC – Algorithm used for frequency estimation and radio direction finding
- Microphone array – Group of microphones operating in tandem
- Multibeam echosounder – Type of sonar used to map the seabed
- Pencil (optics) – Narrow beam of electromagnetic radiation or charged particles
- Periodogram – Estimate of the spectral density of a signal
- Reconfigurable antenna – Antenna capable of modifying its frequency and radiation properties dynamically
- SAMV – Parameter-free superresolution algorithm
- Seismic array – System of linked seismometers
- Sensor array – Group of sensors used to increase gain or dimensionality over a single sensor
- Smart antenna – Antenna arrays with smart signal processing algorithms
- Space–time block code – WiFi option
- Space–time code – Method in wireless communication systems
- Spatial multiplexing – MIMO wireless transmission technique
- Synthetic aperture sonar – Form of sonar using post-processing of sonar data
- Synthetic-aperture magnetometry (SAM) – Nonlinear beamforming approach
- Synthetic-aperture radar – Form of radar used to create images of landscapes
  - Inverse synthetic-aperture radar (ISAR) – Radar 2D mapping technique
- Thinned-array curse – Theorem in electromagnetic theory of antennas
- Three-dimensional beamforming
- WSDMA, also known as Wideband Space Division Multiple Access – High bandwidth channel access method
- Window function – Function used in signal processing
- Zero-forcing precoding
