= Pre-code =

Pre-code may refer to:

- Pre-Code Hollywood (1927–1934), the American film industry between the adoption of sound and the Motion Picture Production Code
- Comics produced before the Comics Code Authority was formed in 1954
- Zero-forcing precoding, a method of spatial signal processing
- Precoding, in multi-antenna wireless communications
