= Differential space–time code =

Differential space–time codes are ways of transmitting data in wireless communications. They are forms of space–time code that do not need to know the channel impairments at the receiver in order to be able to decode the signal. They are usually based on space–time block codes, and transmit one block-code from a set in response to a change in the input signal. The differences among the blocks in the set are designed to allow the receiver to extract the data with good reliability. The first differential space-time block code was disclosed by Vahid Tarokh and Hamid Jafarkhani.
