= Siavash Alamouti =

Iranian–American engineer; inventor of the Alamouti space–time block code

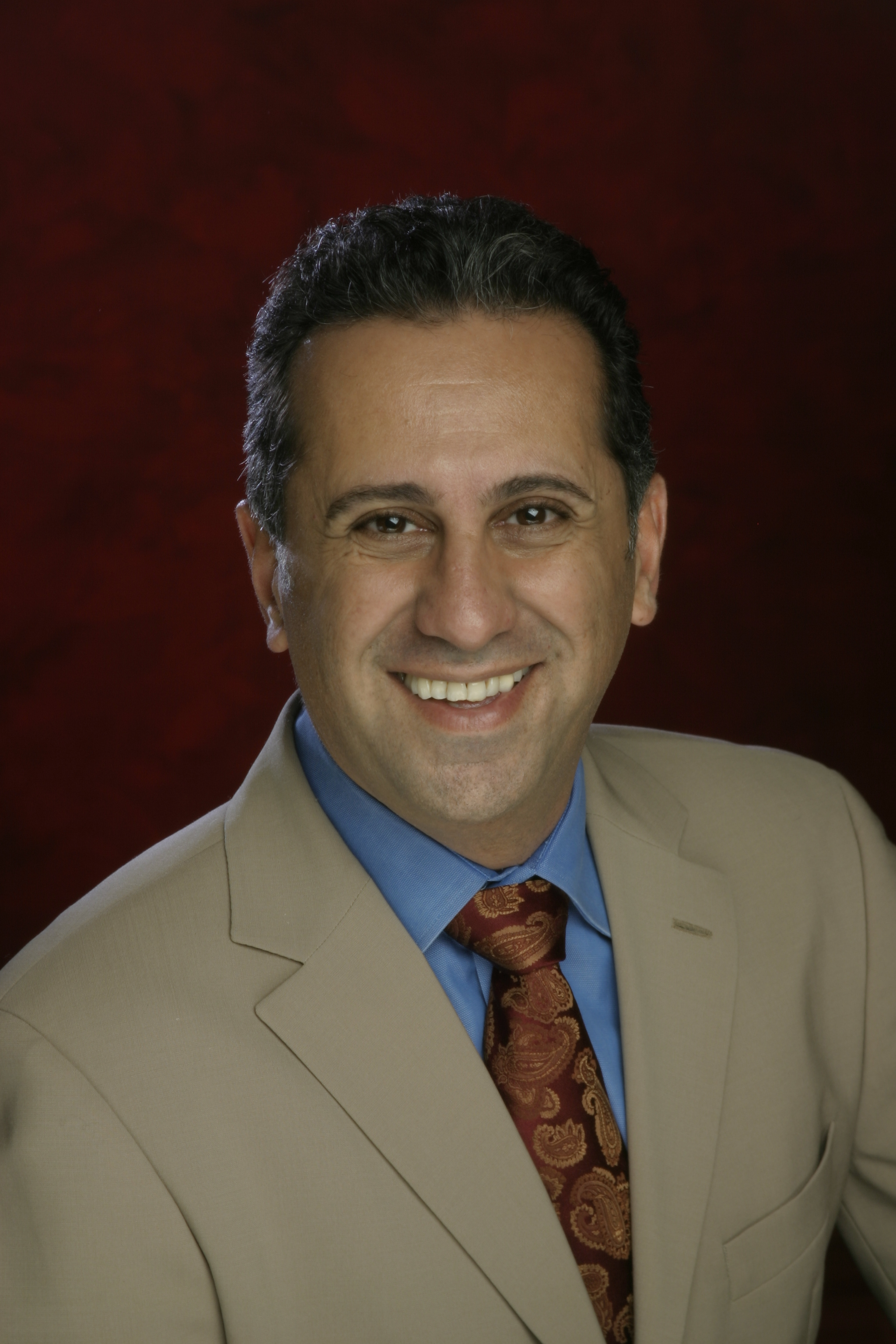
- Born: 1962 (age 63–64); Tehran, Imperial State of Iran
- Citizenship: US, Canada
- Education: Kharazmi Highschool; Sharif University; University of British Columbia (B.A.Sc. and M.A.Sc.)
- Occupation: Business executive
- Title: Executive Chairman of Mimik Technology
- Board member of: Mimik (chair)

Siavash Alamouti is an Iranian-born business executive, entrepreneur, and electrical engineer. He is the executive chairman of Mimik Technology, and was previously the Executive Vice President of Research and Development at Wells Fargo from March 2020 to December 2021. He is known for the 1998 invention of the Alamouti's code, a type of space–time block code.

== Early life and education ==
Siavash Alamouti was born in 1962 in Tehran, Iran. He graduated from Kharazmi Highschool in 1979. He enrolled at Sharif University of Technology in 1980, but was expelled during the Iranian Cultural Revolution due to his political views. He subsequently left Iran, living in Madrid, Spain, before arriving in Canada as a political refugee in 1984. He received B.A.Sc. (1989) and M.A.Sc. (1992) degrees in Electrical Engineering from the University of British Columbia.

He holds dual citizenship of Canada and the United States.

Alamouti started his professional career at MPR Teltech, part of BC Telephone Company (now Telus) in Vancouver, where he worked on early mobile data protocols, including cellular digital packet data.

== Career ==
In 1995, he joined McCaw Cellular (now AT&T Wireless) as a Senior Scientist, where he worked on the physical and MAC layer design of a commercial multiple-input multiple-output orthogonal frequency division multiplexing system known as Project Angel. He later served as CTO of Vivato, the first smart-antenna Wi-Fi company, and held roles at Cadence Design Systems. He was an Intel Fellow and the chief technology officer of the Mobile Wireless Group at Intel, starting in 2004. Alamouti supported Intel's Mobile WiMAX technology.

Siavash Alamouti was the group research and development director at Vodafone Group from March 2010 to 2013. He then served as president and CEO of mimik Technology from January 2014 until January 2020, after which he became the company's executive chairman.

He was awarded the 2022 Marconi Prize.

=== Alamouti's code ===
He invented a 2xN MIMO scheme, today referred to as Alamouti's code (or Alamouti code), designed in 1996 and published in 1998.

Alamouti's code provided inspiration for the development of more general Space Time Block Codes by others, including Nambirajan Seshadri, Vahid Tarokh, Robert Calderbank, and Hamid Jafarkhani. Tarokh, Jafarkhani and Alamouti received the 2013 IEEE Eric E. Sumner Award "for contributions to block signaling for multiple antennas."
