= STTC =

STTC may refer to:

- Space–time trellis code
- United States Army Simulation and Training Technology Center
