= Hlaing Minn =

Hlaing Minn is an electrical engineer at the University of Texas at Dallas in Richardson, Texas. He was named a Fellow of the Institute of Electrical and Electronics Engineers (IEEE) in 2016 for his contributions to synchronization and channel estimation in communication systems.
