= STTD =

STTD may refer to:

- Space–time block coding based transmit diversity, a method of transmit diversity used in UMTS third-generation cellular systems
- Spacetime triangle diagram technique, a special time-domain technique for wave motion
