= Hamid Jafarkhani =

American electrical engineer and professor (born 1966)

- حمید جعفرخانی
- Born: 1966 (age 59–60); Tehran, Iran
- Education: University of Tehran, University of Maryland College Park
- Occupations: electrical engineer, professor

Hamid Jafarkhani (Persian: حمید جعفرخانی) (born 1966, in Tehran) is an Iranian-born American electrical engineer and professor. He serves as the Chancellor's Professor in electrical engineering and computer science in the Henry Samueli School of Engineering at the University of California, Irvine (UC Irvine). His research focuses on communications theory, particularly coding and Wireless communications and networks.

== Biography ==
Prior to studying at the University of Tehran, he was ranked first in the nationwide entrance examination of Iranian universities in 1984. After receiving his B.S. degree in 1989, he studied at the University of Maryland College Park and obtained his M.S. degree in 1994 followed by his Ph.D. in 1997. After graduating, Jafarkhani joined AT&T Laboratories-Research in August 1997 before moving to Broadcom in July 2000 and to the University of California, Irvine in September 2001.

Within the wireless communications field, Jafarkhani is best known as the primary/main inventor of space-time codes (jointly with Siavash Alamouti and Nambirajan Seshadri) and for his two seminal papers which established the field of space–time block coding, published whilst working for AT&T. The first of these, "Space–time block codes from orthogonal designs", established the theoretical basis for space–time block codes, and the second, "Space–time block coding for wireless communications: performance results", provided numerical analysis of the performance of the first such codes. Space–time codes rely on the use of multiple antennas at the transmit side of a wireless link. Multiple copies of the same data are transmitted from these multiple antennas in such a way that the receiver has a much better chance of correctly detecting the signal in the presence of corruption and noise than if just one copy is sent. The performance of space–time coded systems, in terms of the reliability of the transmission is significantly better than non-coded systems. Space–time block codes in particular are known to be simple to implement and effective, and Jafarkhani's ideas in these two papers triggered the massive international research effort into them that continues today.

Later, in 2001, Jafarkhani introduced quasi-orthogonal space–time block codes which overcome some of the difficulties inherent in earlier codes, at a cost of transmitting less data. These too are now widely studied. Then, in 2003 he introduced a more powerful version of his original codes, the super-orthogonal space–time trellis codes which combine the effects of both block codes and space–time trellis codes. Again, this work has led to significant research efforts around the world.

Jafarkhani received a National Science Foundation CAREER award in January 2003 which "recognizes outstanding scientists and engineers who, early in their careers, show exceptional potential for leadership at the frontiers of knowledge". He is also a Fellow of the Institute of Electrical and Electronics Engineers (IEEE) for contributions to space-time coding, an editor of IEEE Transactions on Wireless Communications and an associate editor of IEEE Communications Letters. Jafarkhani is the author of Space-Time Coding: Theory and Practice, published in September 2005.

Jafarkhani is a co-recipient of the 2013 IEEE Eric E. Sumner Award for outstanding contributions to communications technology. He is a recipient of the IEEE Communications Society Award for Advances in Communication.
