= Spatial multiplexing =

MIMO wireless transmission technique

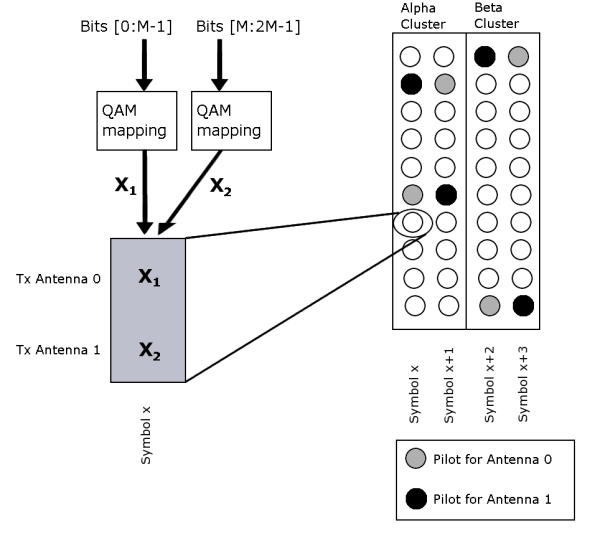
Spatial multiplexing

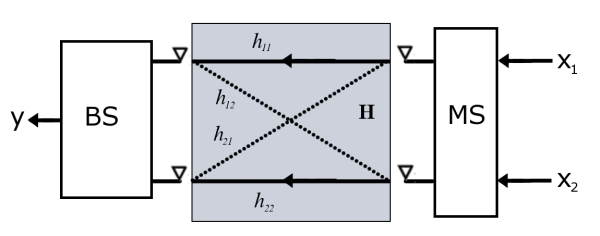
2xSMX or STC+2xMRC

Spatial multiplexing or space-division multiplexing (SM, SDM or SMX) is a multiplexing technique in MIMO wireless communication, fiber-optic communication and other communications technologies used to transmit independent channels separated in space.

== Fiber-optic communication ==
=== Techniques ===
==== Fiber bundles ====
Fiber pairs bundled into a cable are considered a simple form of SDM by physically increasing the number of fiber pairs for each bundle resulting in a larger cable diameter. As of 2026, submarine communication cables are using 48 fibers (24 fiber pairs) per bundle. Terrestrial optical fiber cables can have up to 3,456 fibers.

==== Multi-core fiber (MCF) ====
MCF uses the transverse dimension of the fiber to separate each fiber into two or more channels. MCFs are designed with more than a single channel with a design goal of using the same diameter as a single core fiber with one channel. Different types of MCFs exist, of which “Uncoupled MCF” is the most common, in which each core is treated as an independent optical path. The main limitation of these systems is the presence of inter-core crosstalk. In recent times, different splicing techniques, and coupling methods have been proposed and demonstrated, and despite many of the component technologies still being in the development stage, MCF systems present the capability for huge transmission capacity.

In the late 2010s, component technologies necessary for multicore optical fiber implementation have been demonstrated, such as three-dimensional Y-splitters between different multicore fibers, a universal interconnection among the same fiber cores, and a device for fast swapping and interchange of wavelength-division multiplexed data among cores of multicore optical fiber.

==== Multi-mode fibers (MMF) and Few-mode fibers (FMF) ====
Typical MMF are currently not viable for SDM, as the high mode count results in unmanageable levels of modal coupling and dispersion. The utilization of few-mode fibers, which are MMFs with a core size designed specially to allow a low count of spatial modes, is currently under consideration.

Multi-mode fibers have a larger core that allows the propagation of multiple cylindrical transverse modes (Also referred as linearly polarized modes), in contrast to a single mode fiber (SMF) that only supports the fundamental mode. Each transverse mode is spatially orthogonal, and allows for the propagation in both orthogonal polarization.

Due to physical imperfections, the modes exchange power and are experience different effective refractive indexes as they propagate through the fiber. The power exchange results in modal coupling, and this effect is known to reduce the achievable capacity of the fiber, if the modes experience unequal gain or attenuation. Therefore, if not compensated, the capacity increase is not linear to the mode count. The effective refractive index difference results in inter-symbolic interference, resulting from delay spread.

Mode multiplexers consist of photonic lanterns, multi-plane light conversion, and others.

== Wireless communications ==
If the transmitter is equipped with $N_t$ antennas and the receiver has $N_r$ antennas, the maximum spatial multiplexing order (the number of streams) is,

$$N_s=\min(N_t, N_r)\!$$

if a linear receiver is used. This means that $N_s$ streams can be transmitted in parallel, ideally leading to an $N_s$ increase of the spectral efficiency (the number of bits per second per Hz that can be transmitted over the wireless channel). The practical multiplexing gain can be limited by spatial correlation, which means that some of the parallel streams may have very weak channel gains.

=== Encoding ===
==== Open-loop approach ====
In an open-loop MIMO system with $N_t$ transmitter antennas and $N_r$ receiver antennas, the input-output relationship can be described as

$$\mathbf{y}=\mathbf{Hx}+\mathbf{n}$$

where $\mathbf{x} = [x_1, x_2, \ldots, x_{N_t}]^T$ is the $N_t\times 1$ vector of transmitted symbols, $\mathbf{y,n}$ are the $N_r \times 1$ vectors of received symbols and noise respectively and $\mathbf{H}$ is the $N_r \times N_t$ matrix of channel coefficients. An often encountered problem in open loop spatial multiplexing is to guard against instance of high channel correlation and strong power imbalances between the multiple streams. One such extension which is being considered for DVB-NGH systems is the so-called enhanced Spatial Multiplexing (eSM) scheme.

==== Closed-loop approach ====
A closed-loop MIMO system utilizes Channel State Information (CSI) at the transmitter. In most cases, only partial CSI is available at the transmitter because of the limitations of the feedback channel. In a closed-loop MIMO system the input-output relationship with a closed-loop approach can be described as

$$\mathbf{y}=\mathbf{HWs}+\mathbf{n}$$

where $\mathbf{s} = [s_1, s_2, \ldots, s_{N_s}]^T$ is the $N_s\times 1$ vector of transmitted symbols, $\mathbf{y,n}$ are the $N_r\times 1$ vectors of received symbols and noise respectively, $\mathbf{H}$ is the $N_r\times N_t$ matrix of channel coefficients and $\mathbf{W}$ is the $N_t\times N_s$ linear precoding matrix.

A precoding matrix $\mathbf{W}$ is used to precode the symbols in the vector to enhance the performance. The column dimension $N_s$ of $\mathbf{W}$ can be selected smaller than $N_t$ which is useful if the system requires $N_s (\neq N_t)$ streams because of several reasons. Examples of the reasons are as follows: either the rank of the MIMO channel or the number of receiver antennas is smaller than the number of transmit antennas.

== See also ==
- 3G MIMO
- Space–time code
- Space–time trellis code
- WiMAX MIMO
- Fiber-optic communication
- Multiplexing
