= Three-dimensional beamforming =

Three-dimensional beamforming (3DBF), full dimension MIMO or tilt angle adaptation is an interference coordination method in cellular networks and radar systems which brings significant improvements in comparison with conventional 2D beamforming techniques. Most beamforming schemes currently employed in wireless cellular networks control the beam pattern radiation in the horizontal plane. In contrast to such two-dimensional beamforming (2DBF), 3DBF adapts the radiation beam pattern in both elevation and azimuth planes to provide more degrees of freedom in supporting users. By utilizing information on angle of arrival (AoA) of users provided by suitable antenna hardware such as sector antenna or planar array in both elevation and azimuth planes and estimating direction of arrival (DoA) of each users' signal, base station is capable of distinguishing different users using proper beamforming and also steering the array's beam to a desired direction which optimizes some preferred performance metric of the network.

== Different types of 3DBF ==
Depending on the way that the antenna downtilt is changed, 3DBF can be classified into two categories:

- Static 3DBF refers to a system where the antenna tilt at the BS is set to a fixed value according to some statistical metrics.
- Dynamic 3DBF that steers the BS antenna tilting angle instantaneously according to specific user locations.
