= Space–time block coding based transmit diversity =

Space–time block coding based transmit diversity (STTD) is a method of transmit diversity used in UMTS third-generation cellular systems. STTD is optional in the UTRAN air interface but mandatory for user equipment (UE). STTD utilizes space–time block code (STBC) in order to exploit redundancy in multiple transmitted versions of a signal.

STTD is one of numerous open loop transmit diversity schemes which also include Phase Switched Transmit Diversity (PSTD), Time Switched Diversity (TSTD), Orthogonal Transmit Diversity (OTD) and Space Time Spreading (STS) [1]. The aim of all of these schemes is to smooth the Rayleigh fading and drop out effects observed when using only a single antenna at both ends of a radio link in a Multipath propagation environment. Diversity improves link reliability for each user over time, especially near cell edges (in the absence of soft handoff), and also the average performance of an ensemble of users at any particular instant. Not being reliant on slow channel-state feedback from the mobile (i.e. user equipment) means that open loop STTD is almost immune to Doppler shifts associated with high UE speeds and is the preferred method for this scenario. However, an open loop transmit diversity scheme must not degrade performance for a user close to the base station where the channels may be line of sight and nearly ideal. Since STTD is an orthogonal coding system this is also guaranteed.

STTD can be applied to single symbols in QAM, CDMA codewords, or subcarrier symbols in OFDM and the transmit method has become standardised, especially in 3G cellular wireless [2] as described below. The transmitter coder takes consecutive pairs of data symbols {S1, S2}, normally sent directly from one antenna. For two transmit antennas the symbols {S1, S2} are transmitted unchanged from antenna #1 while simultaneously from antenna #2 is sent the sequence {-S2*, S1*}. At the receiver some linear algebra is needed for decoding. Consider the complex channel gains $h_1 , h_2$ between the TX elements and the single RX element are already known at the receiver. The received signals in the two time slots are

$\{ h_1 S_1 - h_2 S_2^*, \;\; h_1 S_2 + h_2 S_1^* \}$ with some added noise $\{ n_1 ,\; n_2 \}$ . By conjugating the second received symbol within the receiver, we can write the matrix equation
$$\begin{bmatrix}
x_1   \\
x_2^*  \end{bmatrix}  =
\begin{bmatrix}
h_1      & -h_2      \\
h_2^*   & h_1^*
\end{bmatrix}
\begin{bmatrix}
S_1    \\
S_2^*  \end{bmatrix} +
\begin{bmatrix}
n_1    \\
n_2^*  \end{bmatrix}$$

and the least squares solution is to solve for S1 and S2 by matrix inversion:

$$\begin{bmatrix}
\hat S_1   \\
\hat S_2^*  \end{bmatrix}  =
\begin{bmatrix}
h_1      & -h_2      \\
h_2^*   & h_1^*
\end{bmatrix} ^{-1}
\begin{bmatrix}
x_1    \\
x_2^*  \end{bmatrix}
=  {1 \over {h_1h_1^* + h_2h_2^*}}
\begin{bmatrix}
h_1^*      & h_2      \\
-h_2^*   & h_1
\end{bmatrix}
\begin{bmatrix}
x_1   \\
x_2^* \end{bmatrix}$$

This is called the zero forcing solution. It attempts to drive interference between the symbols to zero by a process of weighting linear combinations of the received signals at the two time samples and works perfectly in the absence of errors and noise.

Note that in the inscrutable 3G specifications, for example TS125.211, a consecutive pair of transmitted QPSK symbols, after coding, interleaving etc., is defined by a logical binary string of four bits: $\{ b_0,\; b_1, \; b_2, \; b_3 \}$, representing in-phase and quadrature components and $\{ S_1 = (2b_0-1) + i (2b_1-1),\; S_2 = (2b_2-1) + i (2b_3-1) \}$.

Here $\; -S_1^* = (2 \overline {b_0 } -1) + i (2b_1-1) , \;\; S_2^* = (2b_2-1) + i (2 \overline { b_3 } -1) \}$ where overbar means logical inversion.

For CDMA, STTD is applied to whole codewords rather than consecutive chips. In OFDM applications such as Long Term Evolution (LTE) two transmit element STTD is optionally applied just as above while there is also a 4-element option.

== See also ==
- Diversity scheme
- Multiple-input and multiple-output (MIMO)
- Space diversity
- Space–time coding (STC)
