= WSDMA =

High bandwidth channel access method

WSDMA (Wideband Space Division Multiple Access) is a high bandwidth channel access method, developed for multi-transceiver systems such as active array antennas. WSDMA is a beamforming technique suitable for overlay on the latest air-interface protocols including WCDMA and OFDM. WSDMA enabled systems can determine the angle of arrival (AoA) of received signals to spatially divide a cell sector into many sub-sectors. This spatial awareness provides information necessary to maximise Carrier to Noise+Interference Ratio (CNIR) link budget, through a range of digital processing routines. WSDMA facilitates a flexible approach to how uplink and downlink beamforming is performed and is capable of spatial filtering known interference generating locations.

== Key features ==
- Transmit and receive beam shaping and steering
- Multiple sub-sector path processing
- Spatial interference filtering
- Sector activity scan

== Characteristics and principles of operation ==
=== Active Panel Antenna Calibration ===
Active Panel Antenna systems, comprising a planar array of micro-radios and associated antenna element, rely upon a comprehensive calibration scheme which is able to correct inter-path signal mismatches in phase, amplitude and latency. This facilitates precise control of the uplink and downlink RF beam pattern and avoids distortion effects that occur in the absence of calibration.

=== Multiple Sub-Sector path processing ===
By dividing the cell sector into a number of sub-sector beams, WSDMA provides the network with spatially filtered signals, maximising link budget through improved antenna gain and interference mitigation. This allows for mobile users in the cell to reduce their uplink power transmission, thereby further reducing interference and minimising both base station and UE power consumption. WSDMA provides simultaneous sector-wide and sub-sector beam processing to improve link performance in multipath environments. Sub-sector beam processing can optimise changing user demographics within the cell sector.

=== Downlink WSDMA ===
Downlink WSDMA provides an optimised RF beam pattern, reducing interference in overlap regions of adjacent cell sectors. Long term statistical based adjustment can optimise cell patterns depending on the user population density per spatial region serviced by the cell.

== See also ==
- WCDMA
- OFDM
- Smart Antennas
- Beamforming
- 3G MIMO
