= Spatial correlation (wireless) =

In wireless communication, spatial correlation is the correlation between a signal's spatial direction and the average received signal gain. Theoretically, the performance of wireless communication systems can be improved by having multiple antennas at the transmitter and the receiver. The idea is that if the propagation channels between each pair of transmit and receive antennas are statistically independent and identically distributed, then multiple independent channels with identical characteristics can be created by precoding and be used for either transmitting multiple data streams or increasing the reliability (in terms of bit error rate). In practice, the channels between different antennas are often correlated and therefore the potential multi antenna gains may not always be obtainable.

== Existence ==
In an ideal communication scenario, there is a line-of-sight path between the transmitter and receiver that represents clear spatial channel characteristics. In urban cellular systems, this is seldom the case as base stations are located on rooftops while many users are located either indoors or at streets far from base stations. Thus, there is a non-line-of-sight multipath propagation channel between base stations and users, describing how the signal is reflected at different obstacles on its way from the transmitter to the receiver. However, the received signal may still have a strong spatial signature in the sense that stronger average signal gains are received from certain spatial directions.

Spatial correlation means that there is a correlation between the received average signal gain and the angle of arrival of a signal.

Rich multipath propagation decreases the spatial correlation by spreading the signal such that multipath components are received from many different spatial directions. Short antenna separations increase the spatial correlation as adjacent antennas will receive similar signal components. The existence of spatial correlation has been experimentally validated.

Spatial correlation is often said to degrade the performance of multi antenna systems and put a limit on the number of antennas that can be effectively squeezed into a small device (as a mobile phone). This seems intuitive as spatial correlation decreases the number of independent channels that can be created by precoding, but is not true for all kinds of channel knowledge as described below.

== Mathematical description ==
In a narrowband flat-fading channel with $N_t$ transmit antennas and $N_r$ receive antennas (MIMO), the propagation channel is modeled as

$$\mathbf{y} = \mathbf{H}\mathbf{x} + \mathbf{n}$$

where $\scriptstyle\mathbf{y}$ and $\scriptstyle\mathbf{x}$ are the $\scriptstyle N_r \times 1$ receive and $\scriptstyle N_t \times 1$ transmit vectors, respectively. The $\scriptstyle N_r \times 1$ noise vector is denoted $\scriptstyle\mathbf{n}$. The $ij$th element of the $\scriptstyle N_r \times N_t$ channel matrix $\scriptstyle\mathbf{H}$ describes the channel from the $j$th transmit antenna to the $i$th receive antenna.

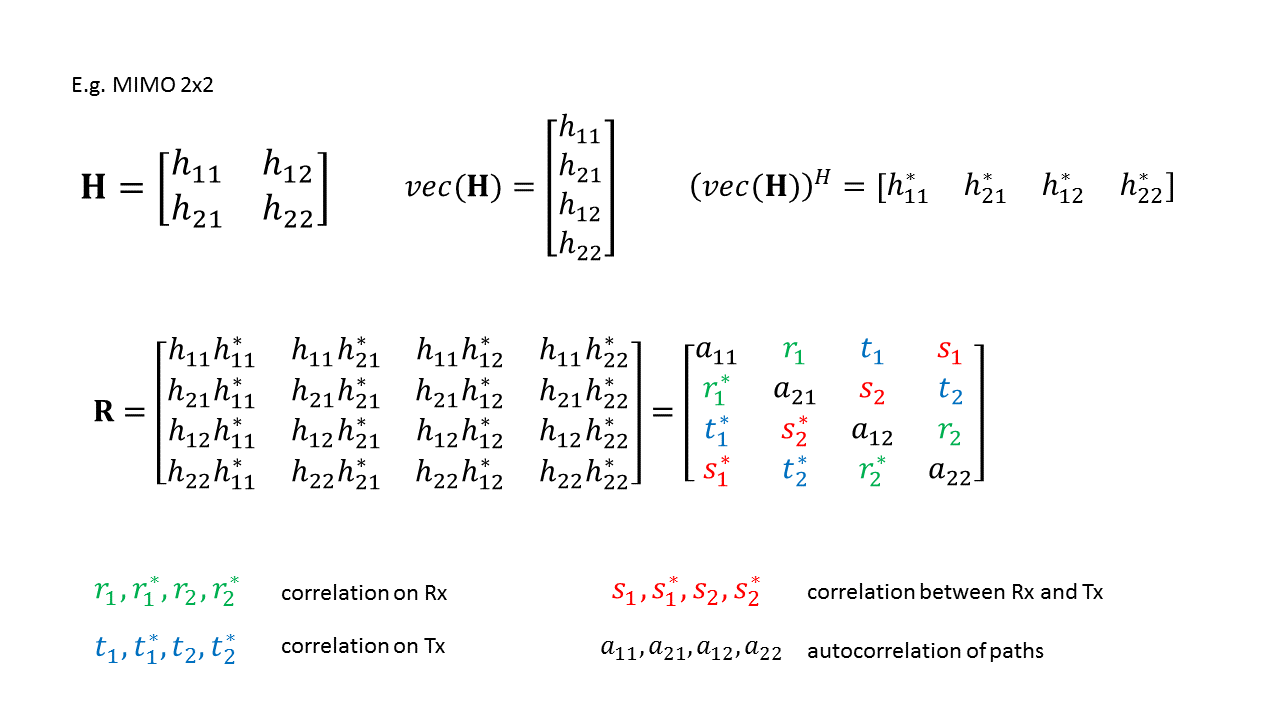
A short illustration of the correlation matrix common formula.

The common formula for the correlation matrix is:

$$\mathbf{R} = E\left\{vec\left(\mathbf{H}\right)\left(vec\left(\mathbf{H}\right)\right)^H\right\}$$

where $vec(*)$ denotes vectorization, $E\{*\}$ denotes expected value and $\mathbf{A}^H$ means Hermitian.

When modeling spatial correlation it is useful to employ the Kronecker model, where the correlation between transmit antennas and receive antennas are assumed independent and separable. This model is reasonable when the main scattering appears close to the antenna arrays and has been validated by both outdoor and indoor measurements.

With Rayleigh fading, the Kronecker model means that the channel matrix can be factorized as

$$\mathbf{H} = \mathbf{R}_R^{1/2} \mathbf{H}_w (\mathbf{R}_T^{1/2})^T$$

where the elements of $\scriptstyle \mathbf{H}_w$ are independent and identically distributed as circular symmetric complex Gaussian with zero-mean and unit variance. The important part of the model is that $\scriptstyle \mathbf{H}_w$ is pre-multiplied by the receive-side spatial correlation matrix $\scriptstyle \mathbf{R}_R$ and post-multiplied by transmit-side spatial correlation matrix $\scriptstyle \mathbf{R}_T$.

Equivalently, the channel matrix can be expressed as

$$\mathbf{H} \sim \mathcal{CN}(\mathbf{0},\mathbf{R}_T \otimes \mathbf{R}_R)$$

where $\otimes$ denotes the Kronecker product.

=== Spatial correlation matrices ===
Under the Kronecker model, the spatial correlation depends directly on the eigenvalue distributions of the correlation matrices $\scriptstyle \mathbf{R}_T$ and $\scriptstyle \mathbf{R}_R$. Each eigenvector represents a spatial direction of the channel and its corresponding eigenvalue describes the average channel/signal gain in this direction. For the transmit-side matrix $\scriptstyle \mathbf{R}_T$ it describes the average gain in a spatial transmit direction, while it describes a spatial receive direction for $\scriptstyle \mathbf{R}_R$.

High spatial correlation is represented by large eigenvalue spread in $\scriptstyle \mathbf{R}_T$ or $\scriptstyle \mathbf{R}_R$, meaning that some spatial directions are statistically stronger than others.

Low spatial correlation is represented by small eigenvalue spread in $\scriptstyle \mathbf{R}_T$ or $\scriptstyle \mathbf{R}_R$, meaning that almost the same signal gain can be expected from all spatial directions.

== Impact on performance ==
The spatial correlation (i.e., the eigenvalue spread in $\scriptstyle \mathbf{R}_T$ or $\scriptstyle \mathbf{R}_R$) affects the performance of a multiantenna system. This effect can be analyzed mathematically by majorization of vectors with eigenvalues.

In information theory, the ergodic channel capacity represents the amount of information that can be transmitted reliably. Intuitively, the channel capacity is always degraded by receive-side spatial correlation as it decreases the number of (strong) spatial directions that the signal is received from. This makes it harder to perform diversity combining.

The impact of transmit-side spatial correlation depends on the channel knowledge. If the transmitter is perfectly informed or is uninformed, then the more spatial correlation there is the less the channel capacity. However, if the transmitter has statistical knowledge (i.e., knows $\scriptstyle \mathbf{R}_T$ and $\scriptstyle \mathbf{R}_R$) it is the other way around – spatial correlation improves the channel capacity since the dominating effect is that the channel uncertainty decreases.

The ergodic channel capacity measures the theoretical performance, but similar results have been proved for more practical performance measures as the error rate.

== Sensor measurements ==
Spatial correlation can have another meaning in the context of sensor data in the context of a variety of applications such as air pollution monitoring. In this context a key characteristic of such applications is that nearby sensor nodes monitoring an environmental feature typically register similar values. This kind of data redundancy due to the spatial correlation between sensor observations inspires the techniques for in-network data aggregation and mining. By measuring the spatial correlation between data sampled by different sensors, a wide class of specialized algorithms can be developed to develop more efficient spatial data mining algorithms as well as more efficient routing strategies.

== See also ==
- MIMO
- Diversity combining
- Multipath propagation
- Precoding
- Spatial multiplexing
