= Noncoherent STC =

Non-coherent space time codes are a way of transmitting data in wireless communications. In this multiple antenna scheme, it is assumed that the receiver only has knowledge of the statistics of the channel. Non-coherent space-time transmission schemes were proposed by Tom Marzetta and Bertrand Hochwald in 1999, but these schemes are complex in terms of implementation.
