= Dirty paper coding =

Coding technique that can compensate for a known interference

In telecommunications, dirty paper coding (DPC) or Costa precoding is a technique for efficient transmission of digital data through a channel subjected to some interference known to the transmitter. The technique consists of precoding the data in order to cancel the interference. Dirty-paper coding achieves the channel capacity without a power penalty and without requiring the receiver to know the interfering signal.

The term dirty paper coding was coined by Max Costa who compared the technique to writing a message on a piece of paper which is partially soiled with random ink strokes or spots. By erasing and adding ink in the proper places, the writer can convey just as much information as if the paper were clean, even though the reader does not know where the dirt was. In this analogy, the paper is the channel, the dirt is interference, the writer is the transmitter, and the reader is the receiver.

Note that DPC at the encoder is an information-theoretic dual of Wyner–Ziv coding at the decoder.

== Variants ==
Instances of dirty paper coding include Costa precoding (1983). Suboptimal approximations of dirty paper coding include Tomlinson–Harashima precoding (THP) published in 1971 and the vector perturbation technique of Hochwald et al. (2005).

== Design considerations ==
DPC and DPC-like techniques require knowledge of the interference state in a non causal manner, such as channel state information of all users and other user data. Hence, the design of a DPC-based system should include a procedure to feed side information to the transmitters.

== Applications ==
In 2003, Caire and Shamai applied DPC to the multi-antenna multi-user downlink, which is referred to as the 'broadcast channel' by information theorists. Since then, there has been widespread use of DPC in wireless networks and into an interference aware coding technique for dynamic wireless networks.

Recently, DPC has also been used for "informed digital watermarking" and is the modulation mechanism used by 10GBASE-T.

== See also ==
- Cognitive radio
- Multiple-input multiple-output communications
- Multi-user MIMO
- Palimpsest
- Reed-Solomon error correction
