= Sample matrix inversion =

Sample matrix inversion (or direct matrix inversion) is an algorithm that estimates weights of an array (adaptive filter) by replacing the correlation matrix $R$ with its estimate. Using $K$ $N$-dimensional samples $X_1, X_2,\dots,X_K$, an unbiased estimate of $R_{X}$, the $N \times N$ correlation matrix of the array signals, may be obtained by means of a simple averaging scheme:

$$\hat{R}_{X} = \frac{1}{K} \sum\limits_{k=1}^K X_k X^H_k,$$

where $H$ is the conjugate transpose. The expression of the theoretically optimal weights requires the inverse of $R_{X}$, and the inverse of the estimates matrix is then used for finding estimated optimal weights.

== See also ==
- Adaptive filter
- Correlation matrix
- Matrix inversion
- Conjugate transpose
- Wiener filter
- Least mean squares filter
- Recursive least squares filter
