= Space–time trellis code =

A space–time trellis code (STTC) is a type of space–time code used in multiple-antenna wireless communications. This scheme transmits multiple, redundant copies of a generalised TCM signal distributed over time and a number of antennas ('space'). These multiple, 'diverse' copies of the data are used by the receiver to attempt to reconstruct the actual transmitted data. For an STC to be used, there must necessarily be multiple transmit antennas, but only a single receive antennas is required; nevertheless multiple receive antennas are often used since the performance of the system is improved by the resulting spatial diversity.

In contrast to space–time block codes (STBCs), they are able to provide both coding gain and diversity gain and have a better bit-error rate performance. In essence they marry single channel continuous time coding with the signaling protocol being used, and extend that with a multi-antenna framework. However, that also means they are more complex than STBCs to encode and decode; they rely on a Viterbi decoder at the receiver where STBCs need only linear processing. Also, whereas in a single transmitter, single receiver framework the Viterbi algorithm (or one of the sequential decoding algorithms) only has to proceed over a trellis in a single time dimension, in here the optimal decoding also has to take into consideration the number of antennas, leading to an extraneous polynomial complexity term.

STTCs were discovered by Vahid Tarokh et al. in 1998.
