= Vahid Tarokh =

Iranian-born American electrical engineer, computer scientist

- وحید تارخ
- Born: c. 1967; Iran
- Education: University of Windsor (MS); University of Waterloo (PhD)
- Scientific career
- Fields: Electrical engineering, mathematics, computer science
- Thesis: Trellis Complexity of Lattices (1995)
- Doctoral advisor: Ian Fraser Blake
- Doctoral students: Natasha Devroye

Vahid Tarokh (Persian: وحید تارخ; born c. 1967) is an Iranian–American electrical engineer, mathematician, computer scientist, and professor. Since 2018, he has served as a professor of electrical and computer engineering, a professor of mathematics, and the Rhodes Family professor of electrical and computer engineering at Duke University. From 2019 to 2021, he was a Microsoft data science investigator at Microsoft Innovation Hub at Duke University. Tarokh works with complex datasets and uses machine learning algorithms to predict catastrophic events.

== Biography ==
Vahid Tarokh was born in Iran. He received the M.Sc. degree in mathematics from University of Windsor, Ontario, Canada in 1992, and the PhD in Electrical Engineering from the University of Waterloo, Ontario, Canada in 1995. At the University of Waterloo, he studied under Ian Fraser Blake, who also served as his Ph.D. advisor; his dissertation was titled Trellis Complexity of Lattices (1995).

He worked at AT&T Labs-Research until 2000, and at Massachusetts Institute of Technology (MIT) as an associate professor from 2000 until 2002. He worked at Harvard University as a Hammond Vinton Hayes senior fellow of electrical engineering, and as a Perkins professor of applied mathematics from 2002 until 2017. He joined Duke University in January 2018.

His current research interests are in representation, computer modeling, inference, and prediction from data.

== Honors ==
- Elected as a member into the National Academy of Engineering (2019).
- Gordon Moore's Distinguished Scholar (2017).
- 2016 Honorary Dr. Tech. H.C. University of Southern Denmark
- Sciencewatch World's Most Influential Scientific Minds (2014).
- 2014 Thomson Reuters Highly Cited Researcher (based only on published papers between 2002–2012).
- 2014 IEEE Communications Society Award for Advances in Communications
- Honorary D. Sc., Concordia University, 2013
- 2013 IEEE Eric E. Sumner Award
- 2012 IEEE TCCN (Technical Committee on Cognitive Networks) Publication Award (for the modeling and information theoretic development of the cognitive radio channel)
- 2011 Guggenheim Fellowship in Applied Mathematics (for contributions to the spectral theory of pseudo-random matrices)
- IEEE Fellow, 2009
- Honorary D.Sc., The University of Windsor, 2003
- IEEE Communications Society 50th Anniversary Recognition (named by the IEEE Communications Society as the author of one of the most important 57 papers published in society's transactions in the past 50 years), 2002
- TR100 Award (selected as one of the top 100 inventors of the year by the Technology Review Magazine), 2002
- Alan T. Waterman Award 2001
- IEEE Information Theory Society Paper Award, 1999
- Governor General of Canada's Academic Gold Medal 1996

== See also ==
- List of University of Waterloo people
