= Diversity =

Diversity, diversify, or diverse may refer to:

== Business ==
- Diversity (business), the inclusion of people of different identities (ethnicity, gender, age) in the workforce
- Diversity marketing, marketing communication targeting diverse customers
- Supplier diversity, the use of diverse suppliers
- Team diversity

== Politics and society ==
- Cultural diversity, the quality of diverse or different cultures
- Diversity (politics), differences among members of a group
- Diversity Immigrant Visa or Green Card Lottery, a United States immigration program
- Diversity jurisdiction, a concept under which U.S. federal courts can hear suits between parties from different states
- Diversity training, the process of educating people to function in a diverse environment
- Diversity, equity, and inclusion, organizational frameworks that seek to promote the fair treatment and full participation of all people
- Functional diversity (disability), a term for special needs, disability, impairment and handicap
- Gender diversity, equitable representation of people of different genders
- Gerodiversity, a multicultural approach to issues of aging
- Intellectual diversity, a diversity of contradictory ideas held within a group
- Multiculturalism, or ethnic diversity, the promotion of multiple ethnic cultures
- Neurodiversity, a framework for understanding human brain function that considers diversity within a range of areas

== Science ==
- Diversity factor, a concept in electrical engineering
- Functional diversity, a term in geography
- Linguistic diversity
- Diversity (mathematics), a generalization of metric space

=== Biology ===
- Biodiversity, degree of variation of life forms within an ecosystem
- Crop diversity, the variance in genetic and phenotypic characteristics of plants used in agriculture
- Diversity index, a statistic to assess the diversity of a population
- Ecosystem diversity, the diversity of a place at the level of ecosystems
- Functional diversity (ecology), the elements of biodiversity that influence how ecosystems function
- Genetic diversity, the total number of genetic characteristics in the genetic makeup of a species
- Nucleotide diversity, a measure of the degree of polymorphism within a population
- Phylogenetic diversity, a measure of biodiversity which incorporates phylogenetic difference between species
- Species diversity, the effective number of species represented in a data set
- Diversity (journal), an academic journal published by MDPI

== Technology ==
- Diversity combining, the combining of multiple received signals into a single improved signal
- Diversity gain, the increase in signal-to-interference ratio due to a diversity scheme
- Diversity scheme, a method for improving reliability of a message signal by using multiple communications channels
- Antenna diversity or space diversity, a method of wireless communication that use two or more antennas to improve reliability
- Cooperative diversity, a multiple antenna technique for improving or maximising total network channel capacities
- Site diversity, multiple receivers for satellite communication
- Time diversity, a technique used in digital communication systems
- Transmit diversity, wireless communication using signals originating from two or more independent sources

== As a proper name ==
=== Music ===
- Diversity (album), a 2010 reggae album by Gentleman
- Diversity (dance troupe), an English dance troupe based in London
- Diversity FM, a radio station in Lancaster, England
- Diverse (rapper)
- "Diverse", a song by Charlie Parker

=== Other ===
- Diversity University, a virtual reality system for education

== See also ==
- Diversification (disambiguation)
