= CDMA spectral efficiency =

System spectral efficiency of communication system

CDMA spectral efficiency refers to the system spectral efficiency in bit/s/Hz/site or Erlang/MHz/site that can be achieved in a certain CDMA based wireless communication system. CDMA techniques (also known as spread spectrum) are characterized by a very low link spectral efficiency in (bit/s)/Hz as compared to non-spread spectrum systems, but a comparable system spectral efficiency.

The system spectral efficiency can be improved by radio resource management techniques, resulting in that a higher number of simultaneous calls and higher data rates can be achieved without adding more radio spectrum or more base station sites. This article is about radio resource management specifically for direct-sequence spread spectrum (DS-CDMA) based cellular systems.

== CDMA based standards ==
Examples of DS-CDMA based cellular systems are:

- the 3GPP/UMTS 3G radio interfaces WCDMA, HSDPA and HSUPA used globally.
- the 3GPP2 2G standard cdmaOne (IS-95) and 3G standards CDMA2000 1x and 1xEV-DO, used especially in the U.S. and South Korea
- the Chinese TD-SCDMA system.

The terminology used in this article is firstly based on 3GPP2 standards.

CDMA is not expected to be used in 4G systems, and is not used in pre-4G systems such as LTE and WiMAX, but is about to be supplemented by more spectral efficient frequency-domain equalization (FDE) techniques such as OFDMA.

== Introduction to radio resource management ==
The aim of improving system spectral efficiency is to use limited radio spectrum resources and radio network infrastructure as efficiently as possible. The objective of radio-resource management is typically to maximize the system spectral efficiency under constraint that the grade of service should be above a certain level. This involves covering a certain area and avoiding outage due to co-channel interference, noise, attenuation caused by long distances, fading caused by shadowing and multipath, Doppler shift and other forms of distortion. The grade of service is also affected by blocking due to admission control, scheduling starvation or inability to guarantee quality of service that is requested by the users.

There are many ways of increasing system spectral efficiency. These include techniques to be implemented at the handset level or at the network level. They include network optimization and vocoder rate encapsulation. Issues faced while deploying these techniques are the cost, upgrade requirements, hardware and software changes (which includes cell phone compatibility corresponding to the changes) to be made and the agreements to be approved from the telecommunication department.

== Quasi-linear interference cancellation (QLIC) ==
Due to its large transmission power, the Common pilot channel (CPICH) probably consumes 15 to 20 percentage of the forward as well as the reverse link capacity. Co-channel interference is obvious. It is hence important to initialize interference cancellation techniques such as pilot interference cancellation (PIC) and forward link interference cancellation (FLIC) together in the network. Quasi-linear interference cancellation (QLIC) is a technique used for both FLIC and PIC.

Along with the forward link, reverse link interference cancellation is also important. Interference will be reduced and the mobiles will have to transmit less power to get the line of sight with the base station which will in turn increase the battery life of the mobile.

== 1/8 rate gating on R-FCH (reverse fundamental channel) ==
The 1/8 rate gating on the reverse fundamental channel (R-FCH) is the method used for gated transmission in a CDMA communication system. A mobile station (mobile phone) in the CDMA communication system transmits a reverse pilot signal at a reverse gating rate which is different from a forward gating rate in a gated mode, and a base station transmits a forward pilot signal at the forward gating rate different from the forward gating rate in a gated mode.

When the duty cycle is 1/8, only 1/8 of the whole power control groups in one frame are transmitted. This behavior is not present in any other CDMA modes.

Another CDMA invention to provide a device and technique for improving a downlink phone capacity and receiving performance by gating an uplink DPCCH signal in a partial period of the power control group in a mobile communication system. The test set's support for the R-FCH gating mode is disabled (off) by default.

If the test set's R-FCH gating mode is enabled (on) and the mobile station (MS) supports the gating mode, the MS will gate the R-FCH/R-Pilot Channel when transmitting at 1/8 rate. This will save around 75% of the power on an average on reverse channels.

== Radio configuration ==
Radio Configuration Table for TIA/EIA-98-E and C.S0002-A standards
Radio Config	Programming mnemonic	C.S0002-A Standard		Test Mode in TIA/EIA-98-E
Radio Config	Programming mnemonic	Forward Traffic Channel Radio Configuration	Reverse Traffic Channel Radio Configuration	Test Mode in TIA/EIA-98-E
(Fwd1, Rvs1)	F1R1	RC1	RC1	1
(Fwd2, Rvs2)	F2R2	RC2	RC2	2
(Fwd3, Rvs3)	F3R3	RC3	RC3	3
(Fwd4, Rvs3)	F4R3	RC4	RC3	4
(Fwd5, Rvs4)	F5R4	RC5	RC4	5

The CDMA radio configuration is defined as a combination of forward and reverse traffic channel transmission formats that are characterized by physical layer parameters such as data rates, error-correction codes, modulation characteristics, and spreading factors. The traffic channel may consist of one or more code channels such as fundamental channels and supplemental channels.

== Quasi-orthogonal functions (QOF) ==
The forward link of a 3G code-division multiple-access (CDMA) system may become a limiting factor when the number of users increases maximal capacity.

The conventional channelization code, Walsh code does not have enough available bits to cope with maximal use. Therefore, the quasi-orthogonal function (QOF), which can process optimal cross-correlation with Walsh code has been used as a method to get around the limitations of the Walsh Codes.

To enhance the overall capacity in such scenarios, alternative sets of orthogonal functions called the quasi-orthogonal functions (QOF), which possess optimal minimax cross correlation with Walsh code sets of variable length, have been incorporated in IS-2000.

This method uses aggregation of multiple quasi-orthogonal functions with a smaller constellation alphabet size for a single user with a joint multi-channel detector. This method is compared with the alternative method for enhancing the maximum throughput using aggregation of a smaller number of Walsh functions, but with a higher constellation alphabet size (multi-level modulation).

There have been many industrial and academic discussions on the trade-offs with respect to better methods for increasing capacity in IS-2000/3G systems. QOF introduces high amount of interference in the network channels, thus limiting its benefits.

== 6 sectorization ==
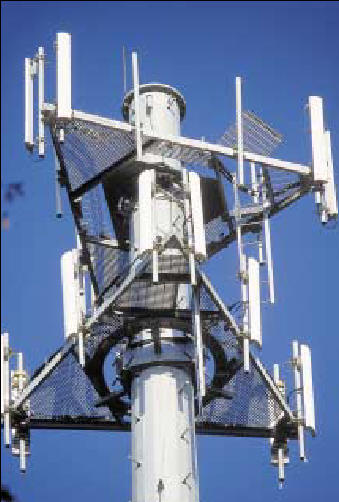
6 sector site in CDMA

There are some places where the utilization of the site is very high and excess softer handoffs occur. For such sites, a 6-sector antenna is one of the solutions, as it provides greater coverage granularity than the traditional 3-sector antenna. Instead of 1 BTS, 2 BTS are used and hence the antennas can be separated from each other by 60 degrees instead of 120 degrees.

== Antenna diversity ==
Antenna diversity, also known as space diversity (micro-diversity as well as macro-diversity, i.e. soft handover, see below), is any one of several wireless diversity schemes that use two or more antennas to improve the quality and reliability of a wireless link.

Often, especially in urban and indoor environments, there is not a clear line-of-sight (LOS) between transmitter and receiver. Instead the signal is reflected along multiple paths before finally being received. Each of these bounces can introduce phase shifts, time delays, attenuations, and even distortions that can destructively interfere with one another at the aperture of the receiving antenna.

Antenna diversity is especially effective at mitigating these multipath propagation situations. This is because multiple antennas afford a receiver several observations of the same signal. Each antenna will experience a different interference environment. Thus, if one antenna is experiencing a deep fade, it is likely that another has a sufficient signal.

Collectively such a system can provide a robust link. While this is primarily seen in receiving systems (diversity reception), the analog has also proven valuable for transmitting systems (transmit diversity) as well.

Inherently an antenna diversity scheme requires additional hardware and integration versus a single antenna system but due to the commonality of the signal paths a fair amount of circuitry can be shared.

With multiple signals there is a greater processing demand placed on the receiver, which can lead to tighter design requirements of the base station. Typically, however, signal reliability is paramount and using multiple antennas is an effective way to decrease the number of drop-outs and lost connections.

== 4th generation vocoder (4GV) ==
Qualcomm's fourth generation vocoder (4GV) is a suite of voice speech codecs expected to be used in future 4G networks as well CDMA networks, that allows the network operators to dynamically prioritize voice quality to increase network capacity while maintaining voice quality. Currently, the 4GV suite offers EVRC-B and EVRC-WB.

Enhanced Variable Rate Codec B (EVRC-B) is a speech codec used by CDMA networks. EVRC-B is an enhancement to EVRC and compresses each 20 milliseconds of 8000 Hz, 16-bit sampled speech input into output frames of one of the four different sizes: Rate 1 - 171 bits, Rate 1/2 - 80 bits, Rate 1/4 - 40 bits, Rate 1/8 - 16 bits.

In addition, there are two zero bit codec frame types: null frames and erasure frames, similar to EVRC. One significant enhancement in EVRC-B is the use of 1/4 rate frames that were not used in EVRC. This provides lower average data rates (ADRs) compared to EVRC, for a given voice quality. The new 4GV Codecs used in CDMA2000 are based on EVRC-B. 4GV is designed to allow service providers to dynamically prioritize voice capacity on their network as required.

The Enhanced Variable Rate Codec (EVRC) is a speech codec used for cellular telephony in cdma2000 systems. EVRC provides excellent speech quality using variable rate coding with 3 possible rates, 8.55, 4.0 and 0.8 kbit/s. However, the Quality of Service (QoS) in cdma2000 systems can significantly benefit from a codec which allows tradeoffs between voice quality and network capacity, which cannot be achieved efficiently with the EVRC.

== Network optimization ==
=== Ec/Io optimization ===
Higher combined Ec/Io, lower traffic channel Ec/Io is required and more BTS power is conserved. Ec/Io is a notation used to represent a dimensionless ratio of the average power of a channel, typically the pilot channel, to the total signal power. It is expressed in dB.

=== Forward and reverse link imbalance ===
There are some remote places where BTS signal penetrates but reverse link of mobile cannot reach back to the base station. Solution is like reducing base station antenna height, down tilt, select lower gains, etc.

=== Excessive soft handoff areas ===
There are some areas with more soft handoff than necessary. The handoff parameters has to be reduced to save the base station power. Set higher values of T_ADD and T_DROP, and check the sector coverage should not be too high or too low.

=== Improper RF parameters settings ===
For best quality decrease the FPCH (Forward Pilot Channel) and FER (Frame Error Rate) settings to 1% and for increase the capacity of highly loaded sites, increase the settings of these parameters to more than 3%.

=== Use repeaters for low utilized sectors ===
Some sites have very low utilization and due to coverage issue, a new site is required in nearby areas. Instead of a new site, a Cellular repeater can be used effectively to provide coverage solutions.

== See also ==
- Frequency reuse
- List of CDMA terminology
- Mobility management
- Near–far problem
- Pseudorandom noise
