= Combining =

Combining may refer to:

- Combine harvester use in agriculture
- Combining capacity, in chemistry
- Combining character, in digital typography
- Combining form, in linguistics
- Combining grapheme joiner, Unicode character that has no visible glyph
- Combining Cyrillic Millions, as above but for one million
- Combining like terms, in algebra
- Combining low line, underline, in typography
- Combining macron below, Unicode combining diacritical mark
- Combining weight, system of chemical weights created by Ernst Gottfried Fischer
- Custom combining, in agriculture harvesting
- Diversity combining, in telecommunications
- Food combining, in nutrition
- Maximal-ratio combining, in telecommunications
- Protein combining, in nutrition
- Write-combining, in computing

== See also ==
- Combine (disambiguation)
- Mixing (disambiguation)
