= Many antennas =

Many antennas is a smart antenna technique which overcomes the performance limitation of single user multiple-input multiple-output (MIMO) techniques. In cellular communication, the maximum number of considered antennas for downlink is 2 and 4 to support 3GPP Long Term Evolution (LTE) and IMT Advanced requirements, respectively. Since the available spectrum band will probably be limited while the data rate requirement will continuously increase beyond IMT-A to support the mobile multimedia services, it is highly probable that the number of transmit antennas at the base station must be increased to 8–64 or more. The installation of many antennas at single base stations introduced many challenges and required development of several high technologies: a new SDMA engine, a new beamforming algorithm and a new antenna array.

- New space-division multiple access (SDMA) engine: multi-user MIMO, network MIMO, coordinate multi-point transmission (COMP) (Cooperative diversity), remote radio equipment (RRE).
- New beam-forming: linear beam-forming such as MF, ZF and MMSE and non-linear beam-forming (precoding) such as Tomlinson-Harashima precoding (THP), vector perturbation (VP), and Dirty paper coding (DPC).
- New antenna array: direct, remote and wireless antenna array.
  - Direct antenna array: linear and 3D phased array, new structure array, and dynamic antenna array.
  - Remote and wireless antenna array: distributed antenna array and cooperative beam-forming.
- Multiple air interfaces: single chip antenna array for an energy efficient short-range transmission.

== History of multiple antennas in cellular communications ==
The table summarizes the recent history of multiple antenna techniques in cellular communications. The table includes the future prediction as well for IMT-A and beyond.

Standards	WCDMA	HSDPA	LTE	IMT Advanced
Deployment	2003	2006	2012	2015
Peak rate (bit/s)	384 k	14 M	100–320 M	1 G
Bandwidth (MHz)	5	5	20	40–100
Tx antennas in a macro-cell	2	2	2–4	4–8
Paradigm	Reliability	Data rate	Peak rate	Average rate
Spatial processing	Spatial diversity: circuit	Spatial diversity: packet	Spatial multiplexing (2–4)	Spatial division (2–4)

== See also ==
- Antenna diversity
- Dynamic single frequency networks (dsfn)
- Spatial multiplexing
- Distributed antenna system
- Single-frequency network (sfn)
- Space–time code
- Space–time block code
- Beamforming
- Precoding
- Dirty paper coding (DPC)
