= Multicast-broadcast single-frequency network =

Multimedia Broadcast multicast service Single Frequency Network (MBSFN) is a communication channel defined in the fourth-generation cellular networking standard called Long-Term Evolution (LTE). The transmission mode is intended as a further improvement of the efficiency of the enhanced Multimedia Broadcast Multicast Service (eMBMS) service, which can deliver services such as mobile TV using the LTE infrastructure, and is expected to compete with dedicated mobile/handheld TV broadcast systems such as DVB-H and DVB-SH. This enables network operators to offer mobile TV without the need for additional expensive licensed spectrum and without requiring new infrastructure and end-user devices.

The eMBMS service can offer many more TV programs in a specific radio frequency spectrum as compared to traditional terrestrial TV broadcasting, since it is based on the principles of Interactive Multicast, where TV content only is transmitted in where there currently are viewers. The eMBMS service also provides better system spectral efficiency than video-on-demand over traditional cellular unicasting services, since in eMBMS, each TV program is only transmitted once in each cell, even if there are several viewers of that program in the same cell. The MBSFN transmission mode further improves the spectral efficiency, since it is based on the principles of Dynamic single frequency networks (DSFN). This implies that it dynamically forms single-frequency networks (SFNs), i.e. groups of adjacent base stations that send the same signal simultaneously on the same frequency sub-carriers, when there are mobile TV viewers of the same TV program content in the adjacent cells. The LTE OFDMA downlink modulation and multiple access scheme eliminates self-interference caused by the SFN:s. Efficient TV transmission using similar combinations of Interactive multicast (IP Multicast) and DSFN has also been suggested for the DVB-T2 and DVB-H systems.

MBMS and mobile TV was a failure in 3G systems, and was offered by very few mobile operators, partly because of its limited peak bit rates and capacity, not allowing standard TV video quality, something that LTE with eMBMS does not suffer from.

== Technical details ==
LTE's Enhanced Multimedia Broadcast Multicast Services (E-MBMS) provides transport features for sending the same content information to all the users in a cell (broadcast) or to a given set of users (subscribers) in a cell (multicast) using a subset of the available radio resources with the remaining available to support transmissions towards a particular user (so-called unicast services). It must not be confused with IP-level broadcast or multicast, which offer no sharing of resources on the radio access level. In E-MBMS it is possible to either use a single eNode-B or multiple eNode-Bs for transmission to multiple UEs. MBSFN is the definition for the latter.

MBSFN is a transmission mode which exploits LTE's OFDM radio interface to send multicast or broadcast data as a multicell transmission over a synchronized single-frequency network (SFN). The transmissions from the multiple cells are sufficiently tightly synchronized for each to arrive at the UE within the OFDM Cyclic Prefix (CP) so as to avoid Inter-Symbol Interference (ISI). In effect, this makes the MBSFN transmission appear to a UE as a transmission from a single large cell, dramatically increasing the Signal-to-Interference Ratio (SIR) due to the absence of inter-cell interference.

== Commercial adoption ==
Commercial deployment of E-MBMS (and therefore MBSFN) features is expected to start in 2013 as an upgrade of existing LTE networks. Lowell McAdam, CEO of Verizon, stated in his CES 2013 keynote that he hopes to have LTE-Broadcast available to live-broadcast the Super Bowl 2014 over its network. On a more general note, he identified live events as the ideal use case for LTE-Broadcast.
