= Voting system (disambiguation) =

A voting system is a set of rules for translating sets of preferences as expressed in an election into actual decisions.

Voting system may also refer to:

== Voting ==
- Vote counting system, the hardware, software, and procedures used to count votes in an election
- Voting machine, technology used to collect and aggregate votes
- Voting methods in deliberative assemblies

== Other ==
- Diversity combining system used in two-way radio
