= Site diversity =

Multiple receivers for satellite communication

Site diversity is a technique used to improve the reliability of satellite communications by limiting atmospheric effects, particularly those caused by rain fade. A diversity scheme is typically required when using frequencies in the Ka, V, or W band.

The downlink transmissions of satellites cover large areas that may have different weather. The site diversity technique consists of linking two or more ground stations receiving the same signal: this way, if the signal is heavily attenuated in one area, another ground station can compensate. Areas of intense rain often have a horizontal length of no more than a few kilometers: putting the ground stations at a sufficient distance reduces the possibility of rain fade in the downlink signal.

The configuration works when the attenuation is not great at the two stations simultaneously, which is usually a valid assumption. Site diversity systems have been known to minimize disruption of service by major satellite carriers.

== See also ==
- Antenna diversity
- Diversity combining
