= Adaptive communications =

Adaptive communications can mean any communications system, or portion thereof, that automatically uses feedback information obtained from the system itself or from the signals carried by the system to modify dynamically one or more of the system operational parameters to improve system performance or to resist degradation. The modification of a system parameter may be discrete, as in hard-switched diversity reception, or may be continuous, as in a predetection combining algorithm.

== See also ==
- Automatic Link Establishment
- Channel use
- CALM M5
