= Multistatic radar =

Multisite radar

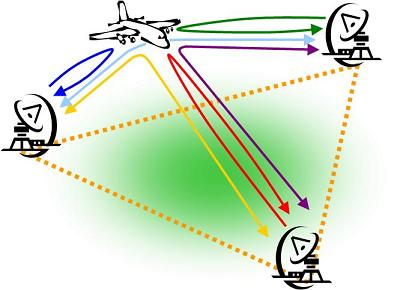
A multistatic radar system

A multistatic radar system contains multiple spatially diverse radar transmitters and receivers with data fusion between component parts. The spatial diversity afforded by multistatic systems allows different aspects of a target to be viewed simultaneously. The potential for information gain can give rise to a number of advantages over conventional systems.

Example multistatic radar systems can consist of: (a) a combination of monostatic radar or bistatic radar components with a shared area of coverage, (b) multiple receivers with a single transmitter, (c) multiple transmitter and receivers.

Multistatic radar is often referred to as "multisite" or "netted" radar and is comparable with the idea of macrodiversity in communications. The MIMO radar may appear similar to (c), but it is more of a phased array technique counting as a single "site" (microdiversity). It is also closely related to the use of MIMO in communications.

== Characteristics ==
Since multistatic radar may contain both monostatic and bistatic components, the advantages and disadvantages of each radar arrangement will also apply to multistatic systems. A system with $N$ transmitters and $M$ receivers will contain $NM$ of these component pairs, each of which may involve a differing bistatic angle and target radar cross section. The following characteristics are unique to the multistatic arrangement, where multiple transmitter-receiver pairs are present:

=== Detection ===
Increased coverage in multistatic radar may be obtained via the spreading of the radar geometry throughout the surveillance area - such that targets might be more likely to be physically closer to transmitter receiver-pairs and thus attain a higher signal-to-noise ratio.

Spatial diversity may also be beneficial when combining information from multiple transmitter-receiver pairs which have a shared coverage. By weighting and integrating individual returns (such as through likelihood ratio based detectors), detection can be optimised to place more emphasis on stronger returns obtained from certain monostatic or bistatic radar cross section values, or from favourable propagation paths, when making a decision as to whether a target is present. This is analogous to the use of antenna diversity in an attempt to improve links in wireless communications.

This is useful where multipath or shadowing effects might otherwise lead to the potential for poor detection performance if only a single radar is used. One notable area of interest is in sea clutter, and how diversity in reflectivity and Doppler shift might prove beneficial for detection in a maritime environment.

Many stealth vehicles are designed to reflect radar energy away from expected radar sources in order to present as small a return to a monostatic system as possible. This leads to more energy being radiated in directions that are only available to multistatic receivers.

=== Resolution ===
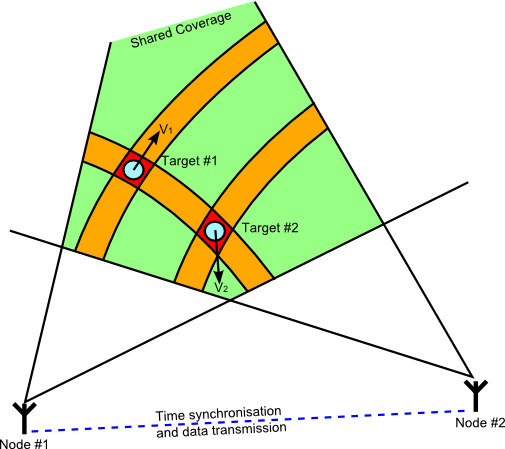
Resolving multiple targets using multistatic radar

Resolution may benefit from spatial diversity, due to the availability of multiple spatially diverse down-range profiles. Conventional radar typically has a much poorer cross-range resolution compared to down-range resolution, thus there is potential for gains through the intersection of constant bistatic range ellipses.

This involves a process of associating individual target detections to form a joint detection. Due to the un-cooperative nature of the targets, there is potential, if several targets are present, for ambiguities or "ghost targets" to be formed. These can be reduced through an increase in information (e.g. use of Doppler information, increase in down-range resolution or addition of further spatially diverse radars to the multistatic system).

=== Classification ===
Target features such as variation in the radar cross section or jet engine modulation may be observed by transmitter-receiver pairs within a multistatic system. The gain in information through observation of different aspects of a target may improve classification of the target. Most existing air defence systems utilize a series of networked monostatic radars, without making use of bistatic pairs within the system.

=== Robustness ===
Increased survivability and "graceful degradation" may result from the spatially distributed nature of multistatic radar. A fault in either transmitter or receiver for a monostatic or bistatic system will lead to a complete loss of radar functionality. From a tactical point of view, a single large transmitter will be easier to locate and destroy compared to several distributed transmitters. Likewise, it may be increasingly difficult to successfully focus jamming on multiple receivers compared to a single site.

=== Spatio-temporal synchronization ===
To deduce the range or velocity of a target relative to a multistatic system, knowledge of the spatial location of transmitters and receivers is required. A shared time and frequency standard also must be maintained if the receiver has no direct line of sight of the transmitter. As in bistatic radar, without this knowledge there would be inaccuracy in the information reported by the radar. For systems exploiting data fusion before detection, there is a need for accurate time and or phase synchronisation of the different receivers. For plot level fusion, time tagging using a standard GPS clock (or similar) is more than sufficient.

=== Communications bandwidth ===
The increase in information from the multiple monostatic or bistatic pairs in the multistatic system must be combined for benefits to be realised. This fusion process may range from the simple case of selecting plots from the receiver closest to a target (ignoring others), increasing in complexity to effectively beamforming through radio signal fusion. Dependent on this, a wide communications bandwidth may be required to pass the relevant data to a point where it can be fused.

=== Processing requirements ===
Data fusion will always mean an increase in processing compared to a single radar. However it may be particularly computationally expensive if significant processing is involved in data fusion, such as attempts to increase resolution.

== Examples of multistatic radar systems ==
Automotive

- Hamburg University of Technology’s Automotive Radar Network (four monostatic)
- University College London’s NetRad System (multiple monostatic)

Scientific

- EISCAT 3D incoherent scatter radar (one colocated transmitter-receiver, four receive-only sites)

Defense

- Massachusetts Institute of Technology’s Netted Radar System (multiple monostatic of different types).
- Jindalee Operational Radar Network (three monostatic / pseudo-bistatic radars)
- Norwegian Defence Research Establishment’s Experimental Bi-Multistatic CW Radar (multiple bistatic pairs)
- Xidian University’s Coast-ship Bi/multistatic Ground-wave Over-the-horizon Radar (multiple transmitters, single receiver)

Passive

- SAIC’s Passive, Multi-Static Radar System

Several passive radar systems make use of multiple spatially diverse transmitters and hence may be considered to operate multistatically.
