= SAIC =

SAIC may refer to:

- SAIC Motor, a Chinese automaker formerly named Shanghai Automotive Industry Corporation
  - SAIC (marque), an electric car brand launched by the automaker in 2025
- School of the Art Institute of Chicago
- Science Applications International Corporation, an American government contractor
  - Science Applications International Corporation, the heritage name of Leidos
- Scottish Aquaculture Innovation Centre
- Single antenna interference cancellation, a technology to boost the capacity of GSM networks
- South African Indian Congress
- Special Agent in Charge, a detective or investigator for a government
- State Administration for Industry and Commerce, an abolished authority in the People's Republic of China
