= Macrodiversity =

Type of space diversity

In the field of wireless communication, macrodiversity is a kind of space diversity scheme using several receiver or transmitter antennas for transferring the same signal. The distance between the transmitters is much longer than the wavelength, as opposed to microdiversity where the distance is in the order of or shorter than the wavelength.

In a cellular network or a wireless LAN, macro-diversity implies that the antennas are typically situated in different base station sites or access points. Receiver macro-diversity is a form of antenna combining, and requires an infrastructure that mediates the signals from the local antennas or receivers to a central receiver or decoder. Transmitter macro-diversity may be a form of simulcasting, where the same signal is sent from several nodes. If the signals are sent over the same physical channel (e.g. the channel frequency and the spreading sequence), the transmitters are said to form a single-frequency network—a term used especially in the broadcasting world.

The aim is to combat fading and to increase the received signal strength and signal quality in exposed positions in between the base stations or access points. Macro diversity may also facilitate efficient multicast services, where the same frequency channel can be used for all transmitters sending the same information. The diversity scheme may be based on transmitter (downlink) macro-diversity and/or receiver (uplink) macro-diversity.

== Examples ==
- CDMA soft handoff:
  - UMTS softer handoff.
- OFDM and frequency-domain equalization (FDE) based single-frequency networks (SFN) are a form of transmitter macrodiversity used in broadcasting networks such as DVB-T and DAB
  - Dynamic single-frequency networks (DSFN), where a scheduling scheme adapts the SFN formations dynamically to traffic conditions and/or receiver conditions
  - 802.16e macro diversity handover (MDHO)
  - 3GPP long-term evolution (LTE) multicast-broadcast single-frequency network (MBSFN), making it possible to efficiently send the same data to many mobiles in adjacent cells.
  - Cooperative diversity, for example 3GPP long term evolution (LTE) coordinated multipoint transmission/reception (CoMP), making it possible to increase the data rate to a mobile situated in the overlap of several base station transmission ranges.

== Forms ==
The baseline form of macrodiversity is called single-user macrodiversity. In this form, single user which may have multiple antennas, communicates with several base stations. Therefore, depending on the spatial degree of freedom (DoF) of the system, user may transmit or receive multiple independent data streams to/from base stations in the same time and frequency resource.

- Single-user macrodiversity
  - Uplink macrodiversity
  - Downlink macrodiversity

In next more advanced form of macrodiversity, multiple distributed users communicate with multiple distributed base stations in the same time and frequency resource. This form of configuration has been shown to utilize available spatial DoF optimally and thus increasing the cellular system capacity and user capacity considerably.

- Multi-user macrodiversity
  - Macrodiversity multiple access channel (MAC)
  - Macrodiversity broadcast channel (BC)

== Mathematical description ==
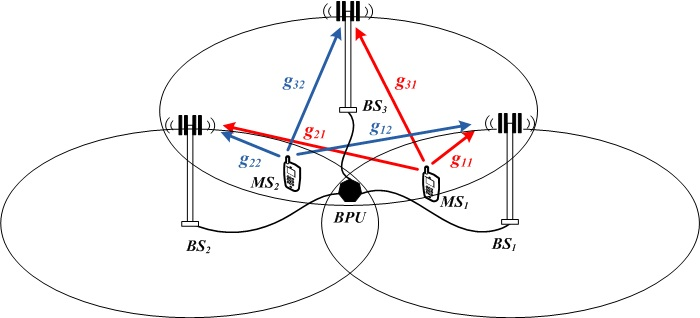
Typical multi-user macrodiversity uplink communication scenario with three base stations (BS) and two mobile stations (MS). All BSs are connected to a back-haul processing unit (BPU).

The macrodiversity multi-user MIMO uplink communication system considered here consists of $\scriptstyle N$ distributed single antenna users and $\scriptstyle n_{R}$ distributed single antenna base stations (BS). Following the well established narrow band flat fading MIMO system model, input-output relationship can be given as

$$\mathbf{y} = \mathbf{H}\mathbf{x} + \mathbf{n}$$

where $\scriptstyle\mathbf{y}$ and $\scriptstyle\mathbf{x}$ are the receive and transmit vectors, respectively, and $\scriptstyle\mathbf{H}$ and $\scriptstyle\mathbf{n}$ are the macrodiversity channel matrix and the spatially uncorrelated AWGN noise vector, respectively. The power spectral density of AWGN noise is assumed to be $\scriptstyle N_0$. The $\scriptstyle i,j$th element of $\scriptstyle\mathbf{H}$, $h_{ij}$ represents the fading coefficient (see Fading) of the $\scriptstyle i,j$th constituent link which in this particular case, is the link between $\scriptstyle j$th user and the $\scriptstyle i$th base station. In macrodiversity scenario,

$$E \left \{ \left| h_{ij} \right |^2 \right \} =
g_{ij} \quad \forall i,j$$,

where $\scriptstyle g_{i,j}$ is called the average link gain giving average link SNR of $\scriptstyle \frac{g_{ij}}{N_0}$. The macrodiversity power profile matrix can thus be defined as

$$\mathbf{G} = \begin{pmatrix}
g_{11} & \dots & g_{1N} \\
g_{21} & \dots & g_{2N} \\
\dots & \dots & \dots \\
g_{n_R1} & \dots & g_{n_RN} \\
\end{pmatrix}.$$

The original input-output relationship may be rewritten in terms of the macrodiversity power profile and so-called normalized channel matrix, $\mathbf{H}_w$, as

$$\mathbf{y} = \left( \left( \mathbf{G}^{\circ\frac{1}{2}} \right) \circ \mathbf{H}_w \right)
\mathbf{x} + \mathbf{n}$$.

where $\mathbf{G}^{\circ \frac{1}{2}}$ is the element-wise square root of $\mathbf{G}$, and the operator, $\circ$, represents Hadamard multiplication (see Hadamard product). The $\scriptstyle i,j$th element of $\mathbf{H}_w$, $h_{w,ij}$, satisfies the condition given by

$$E \left \{ \left| h_{w,ij} \right |^2 \right \} = 1 \quad \forall i,j$$.

It has been shown that there exists a functional link between the permanent of macrodiversity power profile matrix, $\mathbf{G}$ and the performance of multi-user macrodiversity systems in fading. Although it appears as if the macrodiversity only manifests itself in the power profile, systems that rely on macrodiversity will typically have other types of transmit power constraints (e.g., each element of $\mathbf{x}$ has a limited average power) and different sets of coordinating transmitters/receivers when communicating with different users. Note that the input-output relationship above can be easily extended to the case when each transmitter and/or receiver have multiple antennas.

== See also ==
- MIMO
  - Multi-user MIMO
- Antenna diversity
- Diversity schemes
- Diversity combining
  - Maximum ratio combining
  - Selective combining
- Diversity gain
- Microdiversity
- Many Antennas
- Multistatic radar
- Distributed antenna system
