= Jan Uddenfeldt =

Swedish engineer

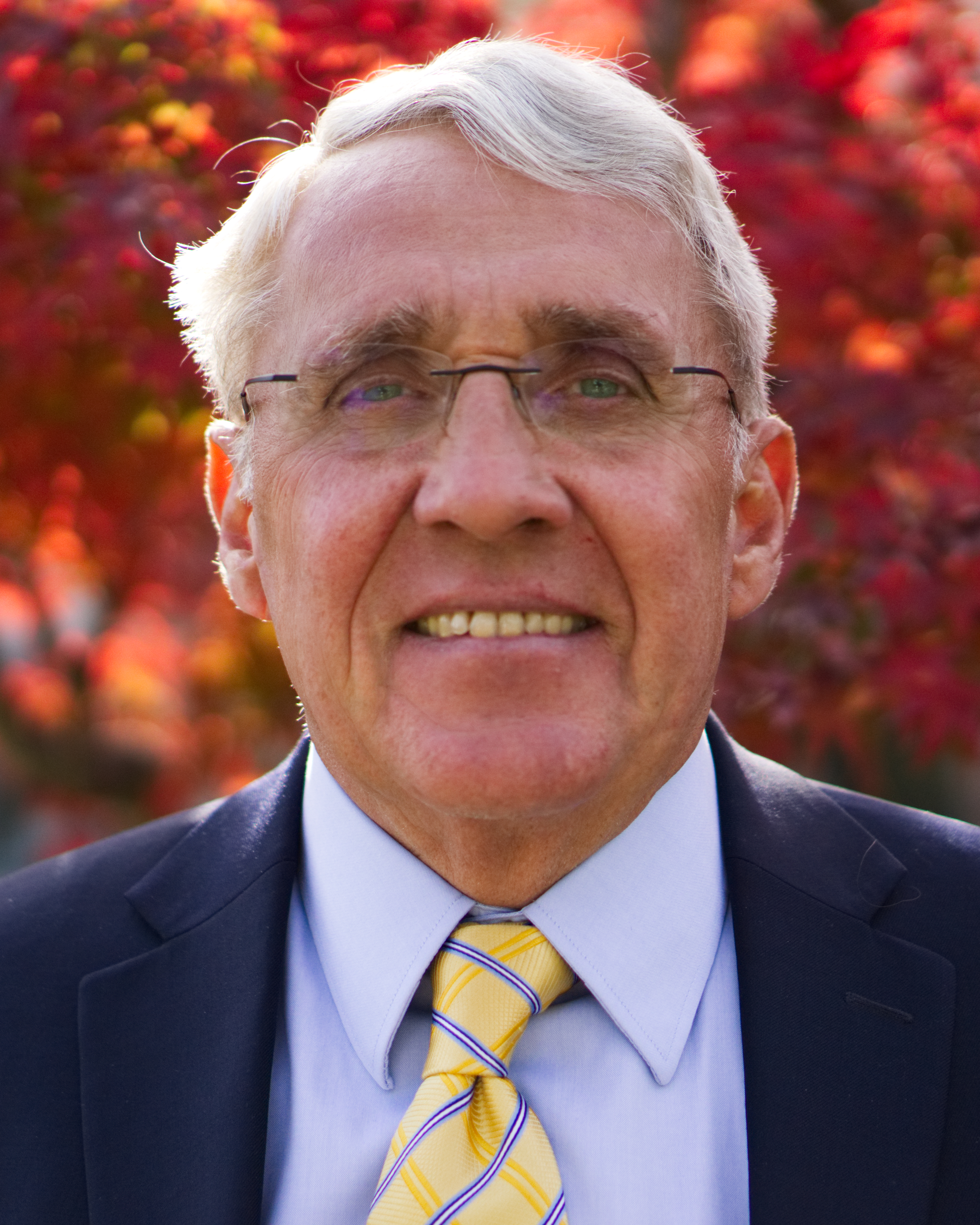
- Uddenfeldt in 2017
- Occupations: Sony Erricson (1989–2010), Air5 (?-present)
- Years active: 1989-present
- Awards: Eduard Rhein Stiftung Prize; NEC C&C Prize (2014); IVA Gold Medal; TechAmerica Innovator Award (in telecom equipment) (2009); Inducted into the Wireless Hall of Fame (2014)

Jan Uddenfeldt is a Swedish engineer who is the former chief technology officer and senior vice-president of Sony Mobile (previously known as Sony Erricson) from 1989 to 2010. He received his PhD in 1973 from the Royal Institute of Technology in Stockholm. He was employed by Erricson in 1978 and became senior vice president of the company in 2004. He became the CTO in 2010. He is the co-founder of Air5 and has been a member of the Royal Academy of Engineering Sciences since 1989. He also is a fellow of the Institute of Electrical and Electronics Engineers.

== Occupations ==
Jan Uddenfeldt was the chief technology officer and the senior vice president of Sony Erricson. He helped develop 4G LTE and 3G wireless as well as Bluetooth. He is now the co-founder of Air5.

== Patents ==
Jan Uddenfeldt has created a patent for Soft handoff, predictive encoding, and more. He created his first patent at 28 years old. He also has developed a thesis on teletransmission.

== Awards ==
- Eduard Rhein Stiftung Prize
- NEC C&C Prize (2014)
- IVA Gold Medal
- TechAmerica Innovator Award (in telecom equipment) (2009)
- Inducted into the Wireless Hall of Fame (2014)
