= ICIC =

ICIC may refer to:

- International Committee on Intellectual Cooperation, an advisory organization for the League of Nations
- International Credit and Investment Company, the former holding company of Bank of Credit and Commerce International
- Inter-cell interference coordination, a management technology for mobile telecommunications
- Islamic Committee of the International Crescent, a relief organization
- Israeli Credit Insurance Company, a subsidiary of the credit insurance company Euler Hermes
