= Electromagnetic interference control =

Control of radiated and conducted energy

In electrical systems, such as telecommunications, power electronics, industrial electronics, power engineering; electromagnetic interference control is the control of radiated and conducted energy such that emissions that are unnecessary for system, subsystem, or equipment operation are reduced, minimized, or eliminated.

Note: Electromagnetic radiated and conducted emissions are controlled regardless of their origin within the system, subsystem, or equipment. Successful electromagnetic interference control with effective susceptibility control leads to electromagnetic compatibility.

== See also ==
- Radio resource management
