= Multi-frequency network =

Data networks, such as Wireless communication networks, have to trade off between services customized for a single terminal and services provided to a large number of terminals. For example, the distribution of multimedia content to a large number of resource limited portable devices (subscribers) is a complicated problem. Therefore, it is important for network operators, content retailers, and service providers to have a way to distribute content and/or other network services in a fast and efficient manner and in such a way as to increase bandwidth utilization and power efficiency.

== Description ==
Multi Frequency Network model Top:Multi Frequency Network Bottom:Single Frequency Network

A multi-frequency network (MFN) is a network in which multiple radio frequencies (RFs) (or RF channels) are used to transmit media content. One type of MFN is a horizontal multi-frequency network (HMFN) where a distribution waveform is transmitted over different RF channels in different local areas. The same or different content may be transmitted as part of distribution waveforms carried over different RF channels in such local areas. Another type of MFN is a vertical multi-frequency network (VMFN) in which multiple radio frequency (RF) channels are used in a given local area to transmit independent distribution waveforms with an aim to increase the capacity of the network (in terms of the ability to deliver more content to a device/end user). An MFN deployment may also consist of VMFN in certain areas and HMFN in certain other areas.

In a typical VMFN, a local operations infrastructure (LOI) comprises transmitting sites that operate to transmit multiple distribution waveforms over multiple RF channels in a selected geographic area. Each distribution waveform may comprise one or more content flows that can be selected at a receiving device for rendering. Adjacent LOIs may utilize the same or different RF channels.

During operation, a receiving device may perform an RF channel switch as a result of a user request or an application request to acquire content on another RF channel. The device may also perform an RF channel switch if content acquisition failure happens for desired content e.g. due to device mobility. The device mobility is defined as the device moving from the coverage area of the current LOI to the coverage area of other neighboring LOIs. The content acquisition failure can also happen due to varying channel conditions without involving device mobility. Typically, the device may switch to any available RF channel that carries the desired content flow. In the case of content acquisition failure due to device mobility, the coverage areas of two or more LOIs may overlap so that multiple RF channels may be available that carry the desired content. These available RF channels belong to different LOIs, and each LOI may comprise a wide variety of additional content carried on other RF channels. If the device randomly selects an RF channel that carries the desired content from the available RF channels, the LOI associated with the selected RF channel may not carry the most additional content. For example, the LOI associated with the selected RF channel may carry less content than LOIs associated with other available RF channels.

Therefore, it would be desirable to have a system that operates to allow a device to select an RF channel carrying the desired content that is associated with a LOI that has the most additional content, thereby providing the device with the ability to switch to the additional content in a fast and efficient manner for an enhanced user experience. It uses OFDM system not COFDM.

- RF with MFN
