= Channel use =

Channel use is a quantity used in signal processing or telecommunication related to symbol rate and channel capacity. Capacity is measured in bits per input symbol into the channel (bits per channel use). If a symbol enters the channel every T_{s} seconds (for every symbol period a symbol is transmitted) the channel capacity in bits per second is C/T_{s}. The phrase "1 bit per channel use" denotes the transmission of 1 symbol (of duration T_{s}) containing 1 data bit.

== See also ==
- Adaptive communications
- End instrument
- Spectral efficiency and modulation efficiency in (bit/s)/Hz
