= Spatial capacity =

Spatial capacity is an indicator of "data intensity" in a transmission medium. It is usually used in conjunction with wireless transport mechanisms. This is analogous to the way that lumens per square meter determine illumination intensity.

Spatial capacity focuses not only on bit rates for data transfer but on bit rates available in confined spaces defined by short transmission ranges. It is measured in bits per second per square meter.

Among those leading research in spatial capacity are Jan Rabaey at the University of California, Berkeley. Some have suggested the term "spatial efficiency" as more descriptive. Marc Weiser, former chief technologist of Xerox PARC, was another contributor to the field who commented on the importance of spatial capacity.

The System spectral efficiency is the spatial capacity divided by the bandwidth in hertz of the available frequency band.

== Relative spatial capacities ==
Engineers at Intel and elsewhere have reported the relative spatial capacities of various wireless technologies as follows:

- IEEE 802.11b 1,000 (bit/s)/m^{2}
- Bluetooth 30,000 (bit/s)/m^{2}
- IEEE 802.11a 83,000 (bit/s)/m^{2}
- Ultra-wideband 1,000,000 (bit/s)/m^{2}
- IEEE 802.11g N/A

== See also ==
- System spectral efficiency
