= Diversification =

Diversification may refer to:

== Biology and agriculture ==
- Genetic divergence, emergence of subpopulations that have accumulated independent genetic changes
- Agricultural diversification involves the re-allocation of some of a farm's resources to new products or non-agricultural activities

== Economics and finance ==
- Diversification (finance) involves spreading investments
- Diversification (marketing strategy) is a corporate strategy to increase market penetration
- Diversification of firms through mergers and acquisitions

== Other uses ==
- Diversified technique, a chiropractic method

== See also ==
- Diversity (disambiguation)
