= Cyclic delay diversity =

Telecommunications technique

Cyclic Delay Diversity (CDD) is a diversity scheme used in OFDM-based telecommunication systems, transforming spatial diversity into frequency diversity and thus avoiding intersymbol interference.

CDD was introduced in 2001 and can gain frequency diversity at the receiver without changing the SISO receiver structure.

The idea of CDD for OFDM had previously also been submitted as a patent application in September 2000.

== See also ==
- OFDM
- diversity scheme
