= Diversity (mathematics) =

Generalization of metric spaces

In mathematics, a diversity is a generalization of the concept of a metric space. The concept was introduced in 2012 by Bryant and Tupper, who call diversities "a form of multi-way metric". The concept finds application in nonlinear analysis.

Given a set $X$, let $\wp_\mbox{fin}(X)$ be the set of finite subsets of $X$. A diversity is a pair $(X,\delta)$ consisting of a set $X$ and a function $\delta \colon \wp_\mbox{fin}(X) \to \mathbb{R}$ satisfying

(D1) $\delta(A)\geq 0$, with $\delta(A)=0$ if and only if $\left|A\right|\leq 1$

and

(D2) if $B\neq\emptyset$ then $\delta(A\cup C)\leq\delta(A\cup B) + \delta(B \cup C)$.

Bryant and Tupper observe that these axioms imply monotonicity; that is, if $A\subseteq B$, then $\delta(A)\leq\delta(B)$. They state that the term "diversity" comes from the appearance of a special case of their definition in work on phylogenetic and ecological diversities. They give the following examples:

== Diameter diversity ==
Let $(X,d)$ be a metric space. Setting $\delta(A)=\max_{a,b\in A} d(a,b)=\operatorname{diam}(A)$ for all $A\in\wp_\mbox{fin}(X)$ defines a diversity.

== L_{1} diversity ==
For all finite $A\subseteq\mathbb{R}^n$ if we define $\delta(A)=\sum_i\max_{a,b}\left\{\left| a_i-b_i\right|\colon a,b\in A\right\}$ then $(\mathbb{R}^n,\delta)$ is a diversity.

== Phylogenetic diversity ==
If T is a phylogenetic tree with taxon set X. For each finite $A\subseteq X$, define $\delta(A)$ as the length of the smallest subtree of T connecting taxa in A. Then $(X, \delta)$ is a (phylogenetic) diversity.

== Steiner diversity ==
Let $(X, d)$ be a metric space. For each finite $A\subseteq X$, let $\delta(A)$ denote the minimum length of a Steiner tree within X connecting elements in A. Then $(X,\delta)$ is a diversity.

== Truncated diversity ==
Let $(X,\delta)$ be a diversity. For all $A\in\wp_\mbox{fin}(X)$ define $\delta^{(k)}(A) = \max\left\{\delta(B)\colon |B|\leq k, B\subseteq A\right\}$. Then if $k\geq 2$, $(X,\delta^{(k)})$ is a diversity.

== Clique diversity ==
If $(X,E)$ is a graph, and $\delta(A)$ is defined for any finite A as the largest clique of A, then $(X,\delta)$ is a diversity.
