= Gating (telecommunication) =

In telecommunication, the term gating has the following meanings:

1. The process of selecting only those portions of a wave between specified time intervals or between specified amplitude limits.
2. The controlling of signals by means of combinational logic elements.
3. A process in which a predetermined set of conditions, when established, permits a second process to occur.

This article incorporates public domain material from Federal Standard 1037C. General Services Administration. Archived from the original on 2022-01-22. (in support of MIL-STD-188).
