= Time diversity =

Time diversity is used in digital communication systems to combat that the transmissions channel may suffer from error bursts due to time-varying channel conditions. The error bursts may be caused by fading in combination with a moving receiver, transmitter or obstacle, or by intermittent electromagnetic interference, for example from crosstalk in a cable, or co-channel interference from radio transmitters.

Time diversity implies that the same data is transmitted multiple times, or a redundant error correcting code is added. By means of bit-interleaving, the error bursts may be spread in time.

== See also ==
- Diversity scheme
