= Inter-cell interference coordination =

In mobile telecommunications, inter-cell interference coordination (ICIC) techniques apply restrictions to the radio resource management (RRM) block, improving favorable channel conditions across subsets of users that are severely impacted by the interference, and thus attaining high spectral efficiency. This coordinated resource management can be achieved through fixed, adaptive or real-time coordination with the help of additional inter-cell signaling in which the signaling rate can vary accordingly. In general, inter-cell signaling refers to the communication interface among neighboring cells and the received measurement message reports from user equipments (UEs).
