= Single-frequency network =

Broadcast network

A single-frequency network (SFN) is a broadcast network where several transmitters simultaneously send the same signal over the same frequency channel.

Single Frequency Network model Top:Multi Frequency Network Bottom:Single Frequency Network

Analog AM and FM radio broadcast networks as well as digital broadcast networks can operate in this manner. SFNs are not generally compatible with analog television transmission, since the SFN results in ghosting due to echoes of the same signal.

A simplified form of SFN can be achieved by a low power co-channel repeater, booster or broadcast translator, which is utilized as a gap filler transmitter.

The aim of SFNs is efficient utilization of the radio spectrum, allowing a higher number of radio and TV programs in comparison to traditional multi-frequency network (MFN) transmission. An SFN may also increase the coverage area and decrease the outage probability in comparison to an MFN, since the total received signal strength may increase to positions midway between the transmitters.

SFN schemes are somewhat analogous to what in non-broadcast wireless communication, for example cellular networks and wireless computer networks, is called transmitter macrodiversity, CDMA soft handoff and Dynamic Single Frequency Networks (DSFN).

SFN transmission can be considered as creating a severe form of multipath propagation. The radio receiver receives several echoes of the same signal, and the constructive or destructive interference among these echoes (also known as self-interference) may result in fading. This is problematic especially in wideband communication and high-data rate digital communications, since the fading in that case is frequency-selective (as opposed to flat fading), and since the time spreading of the echoes may result in intersymbol interference (ISI). Fading and ISI can be avoided by means of diversity schemes and equalization filters.

Transmitters, which are part of a SFN, should not be used for navigation via direction finding as the direction of signal minima or signal maxima can differ from the direction to the transmitter.

== OFDM and COFDM ==
In wideband digital broadcasting, self-interference cancellation is facilitated by the OFDM or COFDM modulation method. OFDM uses a large number of slow low-bandwidth modulators instead of one fast wide-band modulator. Each modulator has its own frequency sub-channel and sub-carrier frequency. Since each modulator is very slow, one can afford to insert a guard interval between the symbols, and thus eliminate the ISI. Although the fading is frequency-selective over the whole frequency channel, it can be considered as flat within the narrowband sub-channel. Thus, advanced equalization filters can be avoided. A forward error correction code (FEC) can counteract some of the sub-carriers being exposed to too much fading to be correctly demodulated.

OFDM is utilized in the terrestrial digital TV broadcasting system DVB-T (used in Europe and other regions), ISDB-T (used in Japan, Brazil, and the Philippines) and in ATSC 3.0. OFDM is also widely used in digital radio systems, including DAB, HD Radio, and T-DMB. Therefore, these systems are well-suited to SFN operation.

== DVB-T SFN ==
In DVB-T a SFN functionality is described as a system in the implementation guide. It allows for re-transmitters, gap-filler transmitters (essentially a low-power synchronous transmitter) and use of SFN between main transmitter towers.

The DVB-T SFN uses the fact that the guard interval of the COFDM signal allows for various length of path echoes to occur is not different from that of multiple transmitters transmitting the same signal onto the same frequency. The critical parameters is that it needs to occur about in the same time and at the same frequency. The versatility of time-transfer systems such as GPS receivers (here assumed to provide PPS and 10 MHz signals) as well as other similar systems allows for phase and frequency coordination among the transmitters. The guard interval allows for a timing budget, of which several microseconds may be allocated to time errors of the time-transfer system used. A GPS receiver worst-case scenario is able to provide +/- 1 μs time, well within the system needs of DVB-T SFN in typical configuration.

In order to achieve the same transmission time on all transmitters, the transmission delay in the network providing the transport to the transmitters needs to be considered. Since the delay from the originating site to the transmitter varies, a system is needed to add delay on the output side such that the signal reaches the transmitters at the same time. This is achieved by the use of special information inserted into the data stream called the Mega-frame Initialization Packet (MIP) which is inserted using a special marker in the MPEG-2 Transport Stream forming a mega-frame. The MIP is time-stamped in the SFN adapter, as measured relative the PPS signal and counted in 100 ns steps (period time of 10 MHz) with the maximum delay (programmed into the SFN adapter) alongside. The SYNC adapter measures the MIP packet against its local variant of PPS using the 10 MHz to measure the actual network delay and then withholding the packets until the maximum delay is achieved. The details is to be found in ETSI TR 101 190 and mega-frame details in ETSI TS 101 191.

It should be understood that the resolution of the mega-frame format is being in steps of 100 ns, whereas the accuracy needs can be in the range of 1-5 μs. The resolution is sufficient for the needed accuracy. There is no strict need for an accuracy limit as this is a network planning aspect, in which the guard-interval is being separated into system time error and path time-error. A 100 ns step represents a 30 m difference, while 1 μs represents a 300 m difference. These distances needs to be compared with the worst-case distance between transmitter towers and reflections. Also, the time accuracy relates to nearby towers in a SFN domain, since a receiver is not expected to see the signal from transmission towers being geographically far apart, so there is no accuracy requirements between these towers.

So called GPS-free solutions exist, which essentially replace GPS as the timing distribution system. Such system may provide benefit in integration with transmission system for the MPEG-2 Transport Stream. It does not change any other aspect of the SFN system as the basic requirements can be met.

== ATSC and 8VSB ==
While not designed with on-channel repeaters in mind, the 8VSB modulation method used in North America for digital TV is relatively good at ghost cancellation. Early experiments at WPSU-TV led to an ATSC standard for SFNs, A/110. ATSC SFNs have seen widest use in mountainous areas like Puerto Rico and Southern California, but are also in use or planned in gentler terrain.

Early ATSC tuners were not very good at handling multipath propagation, but later systems have seen significant improvements.

Through the use of virtual channel numbering, a multi-frequency network (MFN) can appear as an SFN to the viewer in ATSC.

== Alternative modulations ==
Alternatives to using OFDM modulation in SFN self-interference cancellation would be:

- CDMA rake receivers.
- MIMO channels (i.e. phased array antenna)
- Single-carrier frequency-domain-equalization (SC-FDE), i.e. single-carrier modulation combined with guard intervals and FFT-based frequency domain equalization, or its multi-user version Single-carrier FDMA (SC-FDMA).

== See also ==
- Distributed transmission system
- Broadcast translator
- Cooperative diversity
- Macro-diversity
- Multicast-Broadcast Single Frequency Network
- Digital Video Broadcasting, ISDB-T, ATSC
- OFDM, guard interval
- Quasi-synchronous transmission
