= Spectral efficiency =

Information rate that can be transmitted over a given bandwidth

Spectral efficiency (alternatively, spectrum efficiency or bandwidth efficiency) refers to the information rate that can be transmitted over a given bandwidth in a specific communication system. It is a measure of how efficiently limited frequency spectrum is utilized by the physical layer protocol, and sometimes by the medium access control (the channel access protocol).

== Link spectral efficiency ==
=== Definition ===
The link spectral efficiency of a digital communication system is measured in bit/s/Hz, or, less frequently but unambiguously, in (bit/s)/Hz. It is the net bit rate (useful information rate excluding error-correcting codes) or maximum throughput divided by the bandwidth in hertz of a communication channel or a data link.

Alternatively and less commonly, spectral efficiency may be measured in bit/symbol, which is equivalent to bits per channel use (bpcu). This can be calculated by dividing the net bit rate by the symbol rate (modulation rate).

Link spectral efficiency is typically used to analyze the efficiency of a digital modulation method or line code. Spectral efficiency calculations may or may not count bits used for forward error correction (FEC) code and other physical layer overhead. If FEC overhead is excluded, a "bit" refers to a user data bit only.

The modulation efficiency in bit/s is the gross bit rate, which includes any bits used for FEC, divided by the bandwidth.

Example 1: A transmission technique using one kilohertz of bandwidth to transmit 1,000 bits per second has a modulation efficiency of 1 (bit/s)/Hz.

Example 2: A V.92 modem for the telephone network can transfer 56,000 bit/s downstream and 48,000 bit/s upstream over an analog telephone network. Due to filtering in the telephone exchange, the frequency range is limited to between 300 hertz and 3,400 hertz, corresponding to a bandwidth of 3,400 − 300 = 3,100 hertz. The spectral efficiency or modulation efficiency is 56,000/3,100 = 18.1 (bit/s)/Hz downstream, and 48,000/3,100 = 15.5 (bit/s)/Hz upstream.

=== Upper Bound ===
An upper bound for the attainable modulation efficiency is given by the Nyquist rate or Hartley's law as follows: For a signaling alphabet with M alternative symbols, each symbol represents N = log_{2} M bits. N is the modulation efficiency measured in bit/symbol or bpcu. In the case of baseband transmission (line coding or pulse-amplitude modulation) with a baseband bandwidth (or upper cut-off frequency) B, the symbol rate can not exceed 2B symbols/s in view to avoid intersymbol interference. Thus, the spectral efficiency can not exceed 2N (bit/s)/Hz in the baseband transmission case.

In the passband transmission case, a signal with passband bandwidth W can be converted to an equivalent baseband signal (using undersampling or a superheterodyne receiver), with upper cut-off frequency W/2. If double-sideband modulation schemes such as QAM, ASK, PSK or OFDM are used, this results in a maximum symbol rate of W symbols/s, and in that the modulation efficiency can not exceed N (bit/s)/Hz. If digital single-sideband modulation is used, the passband signal with bandwidth W corresponds to a baseband message signal with baseband bandwidth W, resulting in a maximum symbol rate of 2W and an attainable modulation efficiency of 2N (bit/s)/Hz.

Example 3: A 16QAM modem has an alphabet size of M = 16 alternative symbols, with N = 4 bit/symbol or bpcu. Since QAM is a form of double-sideband passband transmission, the spectral efficiency cannot exceed N = 4 (bit/s)/Hz.

Example 4: The 8VSB (8-level vestigial sideband) modulation scheme used in the ATSC digital television standard gives N=3 bit/symbol or bpcu. Since it can be described as nearly single-sideband, the modulation efficiency is close to 2N = 6 (bit/s)/Hz. In practice, ATSC transfers a gross bit rate of 32 Mbit/s over a 6 MHz wide channel, resulting in a modulation efficiency of 32/6 = 5.3 (bit/s)/Hz.

Example 5: The downlink of a V.92 modem uses pulse-amplitude modulation with 128 signal levels, resulting in N = 7 bit/symbol. Since the transmitted signal before passband filtering can be considered as baseband transmission, the spectral efficiency cannot exceed 2N = 14 (bit/s)/Hz over the full baseband channel (0 to 4 kHz). As seen above, a higher spectral efficiency is achieved if we consider the smaller passband bandwidth.

=== With Forward Error Correction ===
If a forward error correction code is used, the spectral efficiency is reduced from the uncoded modulation efficiency figure.

Example 6: If a forward error correction (FEC) code with code rate 1/2 is added, meaning that the encoder input bit rate is one half the encoder output rate, the spectral efficiency is 50% of the modulation efficiency. In exchange for this reduction in spectral efficiency, FEC usually reduces the bit-error rate, and typically enables operation at a lower signal-to-noise ratio (SNR).

An upper bound for the spectral efficiency possible without bit errors in a channel with a certain SNR, if ideal error coding and modulation are assumed, is given by the Shannon–Hartley theorem.

Example 7: If the SNR is 1, corresponding to 0 decibel, the link spectral efficiency can not exceed 1 (bit/s)/Hz for error-free detection (assuming an ideal error-correcting code) according to Shannon–Hartley regardless of the modulation and coding.

=== Discussion ===
Note that the goodput (the amount of application layer useful information) is normally lower than the maximum throughput used in the above calculations, because of packet retransmissions, higher protocol layer overhead, flow control, congestion avoidance, etc. On the other hand, a data compression scheme, such as the V.44 or V.42bis compression used in telephone modems, may however give higher goodput if the transferred data is not already efficiently compressed.

The link spectral efficiency of a wireless telephony link may also be expressed as the maximum number of simultaneous calls over 1 MHz frequency spectrum in erlangs per megahertz, or E/MHz. This measure is also affected by the source coding (data compression) scheme. It may be applied to analog as well as digital transmission.

In wireless networks, the link spectral efficiency can be somewhat misleading, as larger values are not necessarily more efficient in their overall use of radio spectrum. In a wireless network, high link spectral efficiency may result in high sensitivity to co-channel interference (crosstalk), which affects the capacity. For example, in a cellular telephone network with frequency reuse, spectrum spreading and forward error correction reduce the spectral efficiency in (bit/s)/Hz but substantially lower the required signal-to-noise ratio in comparison to non-spread spectrum techniques. This can allow for much denser geographical frequency reuse that compensates for the lower link spectral efficiency, resulting in approximately the same capacity (the same number of simultaneous phone calls) over the same bandwidth, using the same number of base station transmitters. As discussed below, a more relevant measure for wireless networks would be system spectral efficiency in bit/s/Hz per unit area. However, in closed communication links such as telephone lines and cable TV networks, and in noise-limited wireless communication systems where co-channel interference is not a factor, the largest link spectral efficiency that can be supported by the available SNR is generally used.

== System spectral efficiency or area spectral efficiency ==
In digital wireless networks, the system spectral efficiency or area spectral efficiency is typically measured in (bit/s)/Hz per unit area, in (bit/s)/Hz per cell, or in (bit/s)/Hz per site. It is a measure of the quantity of users or services that can be simultaneously supported by a limited radio frequency bandwidth in a defined geographic area. It may, for example, be defined as the maximum aggregated throughput or goodput, i.e., summed over all users in the system, divided by the channel bandwidth and by the covered area or number of base station sites. This measure is affected not only by the single-user transmission technique, but also by multiple access schemes and radio resource management techniques utilized. It can be substantially improved by dynamic radio resource management. If it is defined as a measure of the maximum goodput, retransmissions due to co-channel interference and collisions are excluded. Higher-layer protocol overhead (above the media access control sublayer) is normally neglected.

Example 8: In a cellular system based on frequency-division multiple access (FDMA) with a fixed channel allocation (FCA) cellplan using a frequency reuse factor of 1/4, each base station has access to 1/4 of the total available frequency spectrum. Thus, the maximum possible system spectral efficiency in (bit/s)/Hz per site is 1/4 of the link spectral efficiency. Each base station may be divided into 3 cells by means of 3 sector antennas, also known as a 4/12 reuse pattern. Then each cell has access to 1/12 of the available spectrum, and the system spectral efficiency in (bit/s)/Hz per cell or (bit/s)/Hz per sector is 1/12 of the link spectral efficiency.

The system spectral efficiency of a cellular network may also be expressed as the maximum number of simultaneous phone calls per area unit over 1 MHz frequency spectrum in E/MHz per cell, E/MHz per sector, E/MHz per site, or (E/MHz)/m^{2}. This measure is also affected by the source coding (data compression) scheme. It may be used in analog cellular networks as well.

Low link spectral efficiency in (bit/s)/Hz does not necessarily mean that an encoding scheme is inefficient from a system spectral efficiency point of view. As an example, consider Code Division Multiplexed Access (CDMA) spread spectrum, which is not a particularly spectrally efficient encoding scheme when considering a single channel or single user. However, the fact that one can "layer" multiple channels on the same frequency band means that the system spectrum utilization for a multi-channel CDMA system can be very good.

Example 9: In the W-CDMA 3G cellular system, every phone call is compressed to a maximum of 8,500 bit/s (the useful bitrate), and spread out over a 5 MHz wide frequency channel. This corresponds to a link throughput of only 8,500/5,000,000 = 0.0017 (bit/s)/Hz. Let us assume that 100 simultaneous (non-silent) calls are possible in the same cell. Spread spectrum makes it possible to have as low a frequency reuse factor as 1, if each base station is divided into 3 cells by means of 3 directional sector antennas. This corresponds to a system spectrum efficiency of over 1 × 100 × 0.0017 = 0.17 (bit/s)/Hz per site, and 0.17/3 = 0.06 (bit/s)/Hz per cell or sector.

The spectral efficiency can be improved by radio resource management techniques such as efficient fixed or dynamic channel allocation, power control, link adaptation and diversity schemes.

A combined fairness measure and system spectral efficiency measure is the fairly shared spectral efficiency.

== Comparison table ==
Examples of predicted numerical spectral efficiency values of some common communication systems can be found in the table below. These results will not be achieved in all systems. Those further from the transmitter will not get this performance.

Spectral efficiency of common communication systems

Service	Standard	Launch year	Max. net bit rate per carrier and spatial stream, R (Mbit/s)	Bandwidth per carrier, B (MHz)	Max. link spectral efficiency, R/B (bit/(s⋅Hz))		Typical reuse factor, 1/K	System spectral efficiency, R/B⋅K (bit/(s⋅Hz) per site)
Service	Standard	Launch year	Max. net bit rate per carrier and spatial stream, R (Mbit/s)	Bandwidth per carrier, B (MHz)	SISO	MIMO	Typical reuse factor, 1/K	System spectral efficiency, R/B⋅K (bit/(s⋅Hz) per site)
1G cellular	NMT 450 modem	1981	0.0012	0.025	0.45	—N/a	1/7	0.064
1G cellular	AMPS modem	1983	0.0003	0.030	0.001	—N/a	1/7	0.0015
2G cellular	GSM	1991	0.013 × 8 timeslots = 0.104	0.2	0.52	—N/a	1/9 (1/3 in 1999)	0.17 (in 1999)
2G cellular	D-AMPS	1991	0.013 × 3 timeslots = 0.039	0.030	1.3	—N/a	1/9 (1/3 in 1999)	0.45 (in 1999)
2.75G cellular	CDMA2000 1× voice	2000	0.0096 per phone call × 22 calls	1.2288	0.0078 per call	—N/a	1	0.172 (fully loaded)
2.75G cellular	GSM + EDGE	2003	0.384 (typ. 0.20)	0.2	1.92 (typ. 1.00)	—N/a	1/3	0.33
2.75G cellular	IS-136HS + EDGE		0.384 (typ. 0.27)	0.200	1.92 (typ. 1.35)	—N/a	1/3	0.45
3G cellular	WCDMA FDD	2001	0.384	5	0.077	—N/a	1	0.51
3G cellular	CDMA2000 1× PD	2002	0.153	1.2288	0.125	—N/a	1	0.1720 (fully loaded)
3G cellular	CDMA2000 1×EV-DO Rev.A	2002	3.072	1.2288	2.5	—N/a	1	1.3
Fixed WiMAX	IEEE 802.16d	2004	96	20	4.8		1/4	1.2
3.5G cellular	HSDPA	2007	21.1	5	4.22		1	4.22
4G MBWA	iBurst HC-SDMA	2005	3.9	0.625		7.3	1	7.3
4G cellular	LTE	2009	81.6	20	4.08	16.32 (4×4)	1 (1/3 at the perimeters)	16.32
4G cellular	LTE-Advanced	2013	75	20	3.75	30.00 (8×8)	1 (1/3 at the perimeters)	30
Wi-Fi	IEEE 802.11a/g	2003	54	20	2.7	—N/a	1/3	0.900
Wi-Fi	IEEE 802.11n (Wi-Fi 4)	2007	72.2 (up to 150)	20 (up to 40)	3.61 (up to 3.75)	Up to 15.0 (4×4, 40 MHz)	1/3	5.0 (4×4, 40 MHz)
Wi-Fi	IEEE 802.11ac (Wi-Fi 5)	2012	433.3 (up to 866.7)	80 (up to 160)	5.42	Up to 43.3 (8×8, 160 MHz)	1/3	14.4 (8×8, 160 MHz)
Wi-Fi	IEEE 802.11ax (Wi-Fi 6)	2019	600.5 (up to 1201)	80 (up to 160)	7.5	Up to 60 (8×8, 160 MHz)	1/3	20 (8×8, 160 MHz)
WiGig	IEEE 802.11ad	2013	6756	2160	3	—N/a	1	3
Trunked radio system	TETRA, low FEC	1998	4 timeslots = 0.019 (0.029 without FEC)	0.025	0.8	—N/a	1/7	0.1
Trunked radio system	TETRA II with TEDS, 64-QAM, 150 kHz, low FEC	2011	4 timeslots = 0.538	0.150 (scalable to 0.025)	3.6	—N/a		
Digital radio	DAB	1995	0.576 to 1.152	1.712	0.34 to 0.67	—N/a	1/5	0.07 to 0.13
Digital radio	DAB with SFN	1995	0.576 to 1.152	1.712	0.34 to 0.67	—N/a	1	0.34 to 0.67
Digital TV	DVB-T	1997	31.67 (typ. 24)	8	4.0 (typ. 3.0)	—N/a	1/7	0.57
Digital TV	DVB-T with SFN	1996	31.67 (typ. 24)	8	4.0 (typ. 3.0)	—N/a	1	4.0 (typ. 3.0)
Digital TV	DVB-T2	2009	45.5 (typ. 40)	8	5.7 (typ. 5.0)	—N/a	1/7	0.81
Digital TV	DVB-T2 with SFN	2009	45.5 (typ. 40)	8	5.7 (typ. 5.0)	—N/a	1	5.7 (typ. 5.0)
Digital TV	DVB-S	1995	33.8 for 5.1 C/N (44.4 for 7.8 C/N)	27.5	1.2 (1.6)	—N/a	1/4	0.3 (0.4)
Digital TV	DVB-S2	2005	46 for 5.1 C/N (58.8 for 7.8 C/N)	30 (typ.)	1.5 (2.0)	—N/a	1/4	0.4 (0.5)
Digital TV	ATSC with DTx	1996	32	19.39	1.6	—N/a	1	3.23
Digital TV	DVB-H	2007	5.5 to 11	8	0.68 to 1.4	—N/a	1/5	0.14 to 0.28
Digital TV	DVB-H with SFN	2007	5.5 to 11	8	0.68 to 1.4	—N/a	1	0.68 to 1.4
Digital cable TV	DVB-C 256-QAM mode	1994	38	6	6.33	—N/a	—N/a	—N/a
Broadband CATV modem	DOCSIS 3.1 QAM-4096, 25 kHz OFDM spacing, LDPC	2016	1890	192	9.84	—N/a	—N/a	—N/a
Broadband modem	ADSL2 downlink		12	0.962	12.47	—N/a	—N/a	—N/a
Broadband modem	ADSL2+ downlink		28	2.109	13.59	—N/a	—N/a	—N/a
Telephone modem	V.92 downlink	1999	0.056	0.004	14.0	—N/a	—N/a	—N/a

N/A means not applicable.

== See also ==
- Baud
- CDMA spectral efficiency
- Channel capacity
- Comparison of mobile phone standards
- Cooper's Law
- Goodput
- Network throughput
- Orders of magnitude (bit rate)
- Radio resource management (RRM)
- Spatial capacity
