= Maximum-ratio combining =

Combining signals in telecommunications

In telecommunications, maximum-ratio combining (MRC), or maximal-ratio combining, is a method of diversity combining in which:

1. the signals from each channel are added together,
2. the gain of each channel is made proportional to the rms signal level and inversely proportional to the mean square noise level in that channel.
3. different proportionality constants are used for each channel.

It is also known as ratio-squared combining and predetection combining. Maximum-ratio combining is the optimum combiner for independent additive white Gaussian noise channels.

MRC can restore a signal to its original shape. The technique was invented by American engineer Leonard R. Kahn in 1954.

MRC has also been found in the field of neuroscience, where it has been shown that neurons in the retina scale their dependence on two sources of input in proportion to the signal-to-noise ratio of the inputs.

This has the advantage of producing an output with acceptable SNR even when none of the individual signals are themselves acceptable.

== Example: least squares estimate in the case of Rx diversity ==
We consider an example of which the receiver is endowed with N antennas. In this case, the received vector $y$ is

| $y=hs+\rho n \,$ | 1 |

where $n$ is noise vector $n \sim CN(0, I_{N \times N})$. Following the ML detection criterion the detection procedure may be written as

| $\tilde{s}=argmin_{s \in \mathcal{M}}|\hat{s}-s|^2,$ | 2 |

where $\mathcal{M}$ is the considered constellation of $s$ and $\hat{s}$ is the least square solution to the above model.

| $\hat{s}=(h^*h)^{-1}h^*y.$ | 3 |

The least square solution in this case is also known as maximum-ratio-combining (MRC). In the case of N antennas the LS can be written as

| $\hat{s}=\frac{h_0^*y_0+h_1^*y_1+...+h_{N-1}^*y_{N-1}}{|h_0|^2+|h_1|^2+...+|h_{N-1}|^2},$ | 4 |

which means that the signal from each antenna is rotated and weighted according to the phase and strength of the channel, such that the signals from all antennas are combined to yield the maximum ratio between signal and noise terms.
