= Single antenna interference cancellation =

Single antenna interference cancellation (SAIC) is a technique used to boost the capacity of global system for mobile communications (GSM) networks without any other changes needed in the network. In a GPS network, there is a trade-off between downlink capacity and interference level. To optimize this trade-off, the mobile station (i.e. a cell phone) must exploit a property of the interferers. The techniques used to do this are commonly referred to as single antenna interference cancellation.

== Use ==
Network operators want to use the allocated spectrum as efficiently as possible and to the highest possible capacity, to maximize the return from the investment into the license for it. The ideal frequency reuse is one, meaning that each cell can operate at the same frequency. This in turn creates interference to users operating in nearby places. Increase interference causes voice quality to drop and may cause call drop. It is possible to cancel the interference at the mobile handset side by changing the baseband software without changing anything at the network side. SAIC-enabled mobiles can work at high levels of interference, and need less transmit power from the network, which in turn reduces interference in the network. Studies show that the speech quality gain can be about 6% at a SAIC mobiles penetration of 10%, about 37% at a SAIC mobile penetration of 50%, and about 99% at a SAIC mobiles penetration of 100%.
