= Diversity gain =

Diversity gain is the increase in signal-to-interference ratio due to some diversity scheme, or how much the transmission power can be reduced when a diversity scheme is introduced, without a performance loss. Diversity gain is usually expressed in decibels, and sometimes as a power ratio. An example is soft handoff gain. For selection combining N signals are received, and the strongest signal is selected. When the N signals are independent and Rayleigh distributed, the expected diversity gain has been shown to be $\sum_{k=1}^{N}\frac{1}{k}$, expressed as a power ratio.

== See also ==
- Array gain
- Diversity combining
