= Soft handover =

Soft handover or soft handoff refers to a feature used by the CDMA and W-CDMA standards, where a cell phone is simultaneously connected to two or more cells (or cell sectors) during a call. If any of the sectors are from the same physical cell site (a sectorised site), these sectors are considered to be in softer handoff. This technique is a form of mobile-assisted handover, for IS-95/CDMA2000 CDMA cell phones continuously make power measurements of a list of neighboring cell sites, and determine whether or not to request or end soft handover with the cell sectors on the list.

Due to the properties of the CDMA signaling scheme, it is possible for a CDMA phone to simultaneously receive signals from two or more radio base stations that are transmitting the same bit stream (using different transmission codes) on the different physical channels in the same frequency bandwidth. If the signal power from two or more radio base stations is nearly the same, the phone receiver can combine the received signals in such a way that the bit stream is decoded much more reliably than if only one base station were transmitting to the subscriber station. If any one of these signals fades significantly, there will be a relatively high probability of having adequate signal strength from one of the other radio base stations.

On the uplink (phone-to-cell-site), any cell sites that are actively supporting the call in softer handoff will physically combine the data received on their sectors into single bit streams for their respective physical cell sites, and then all cell sites in soft handover will send their bit streams back to the Radio Network Controller (RNC), along with information about the quality of the received bits. The RNC examines the quality of all these bit streams and dynamically chooses the bit stream with the highest quality. Again, if the signal degrades rapidly, the chance is still good that a strong signal will be available at one of the other cell sectors that is supporting the call in soft handover.

Soft handover results in a diversity gain called soft handover gain.

== See also ==
- Handoff
- Macrodiversity
- Dynamic Single-Frequency Networks
