= Diversity scheme =

Methods to improve communications reliability

Terrestrial microwave radio system with two antenna arrays configured for space-diversity

In telecommunications, a diversity scheme refers to a method for improving the reliability of a message signal by using two or more communication channels with different characteristics. Diversity is mainly used in radio communication and is a common technique for combating fading and co-channel interference and avoiding error bursts. It is based on the fact that individual channels experience fades and interference at different, random times, i.e., they are at least partly independent. Multiple versions of the same signal may be transmitted and/or received and combined in the receiver. Alternatively, a redundant forward error correction code may be added and different parts of the message transmitted over different channels. Diversity techniques may exploit the multipath propagation, resulting in a diversity gain, often measured in decibels.

== Diversity techniques ==
The following classes of diversity schemes can be identified:

- Time diversity: Multiple versions of the same signal are transmitted at different time instants. Alternatively, a redundant forward error correction code is added and the message is spread in time by means of bit-interleaving before it is transmitted. Thus, error bursts are avoided, which simplifies the error correction.
- Frequency diversity: The signal is transmitted using several frequency channels or spread over a wide spectrum that is affected by frequency-selective fading. Later examples include:
  - OFDM modulation in combination with subcarrier interleaving and forward error correction
  - Spread spectrum, for example frequency hopping or DS-CDMA.
- Space diversity: The signal is transmitted over several different propagation paths. In the case of wired transmission, this can be achieved by transmitting via multiple wires. In the case of wireless transmission, it can be achieved by antenna diversity using multiple transmitter antennas (transmit diversity) and/or multiple receiving antennas (reception diversity). In the latter case, a diversity combining technique is applied before further signal processing takes place. If the antennas are far apart, for example at different cellular base station sites or WLAN access points, this is called macrodiversity or site diversity. If the antennas are at a distance in the order of one wavelength, this is called microdiversity. A special case is phased antenna arrays, which also can be used for beamforming, MIMO channels and space–time coding (STC).
- Polarization diversity: Multiple versions of a signal are transmitted and received via antennas with different polarization. A diversity combining technique is applied on the receiver side.
- Multiuser diversity: Multiuser diversity is obtained by opportunistic user scheduling at either the transmitter or the receiver. Opportunistic user scheduling is as follows: at any given time, the transmitter selects the best user among candidate receivers according to the qualities of each channel between the transmitter and each receiver. A receiver must feed back the channel quality information to the transmitter using limited levels of resolution, in order for the transmitter to implement Multiuser diversity.
- Cooperative diversity: Achieves antenna diversity gain by using the cooperation of distributed antennas belonging to each node.

== Combiner techniques ==
An important element in communication systems applying diversity schemes is the "Combiner", which processes the redundantly received signals. Combiner technologies are traditionally classified according to Brennan:

- Maximal-Ratio Combiner
- Equal-Gain Combiner
- Scanning/Switching Combiner
- Selection Combiner

To combine parallel redundant transmitted longer signal sequences, for example network packets, the principle of a Timing Combiner was defined in 2012. Similarly working like a Selection Combiner, the first fully received and valid data packet will be immediately further processed, whereas the later arriving redundant packets will be immediately discarded after reception. With this approach, always the faster of the redundant channels "wins", yielding significant performance improvements especially in wireless applications.

== See also ==
- Aperture synthesis – Mixing signals from many telescopes to produce images with high angular resolution
- Channel access method – Means for multiple terminals to communicate over one medium
- Cooperative diversity – Communications technology technique
- Cyclic delay diversity
- Fresnel zone – Region of space between a transmitting and receiving antenna
- Space–time coding – Method in wireless communication systems
- Tropospheric scatter – Method of communicating with microwave radio signals over considerable distances
