= Antenna diversity =

Redundancy method to improve communications reliability

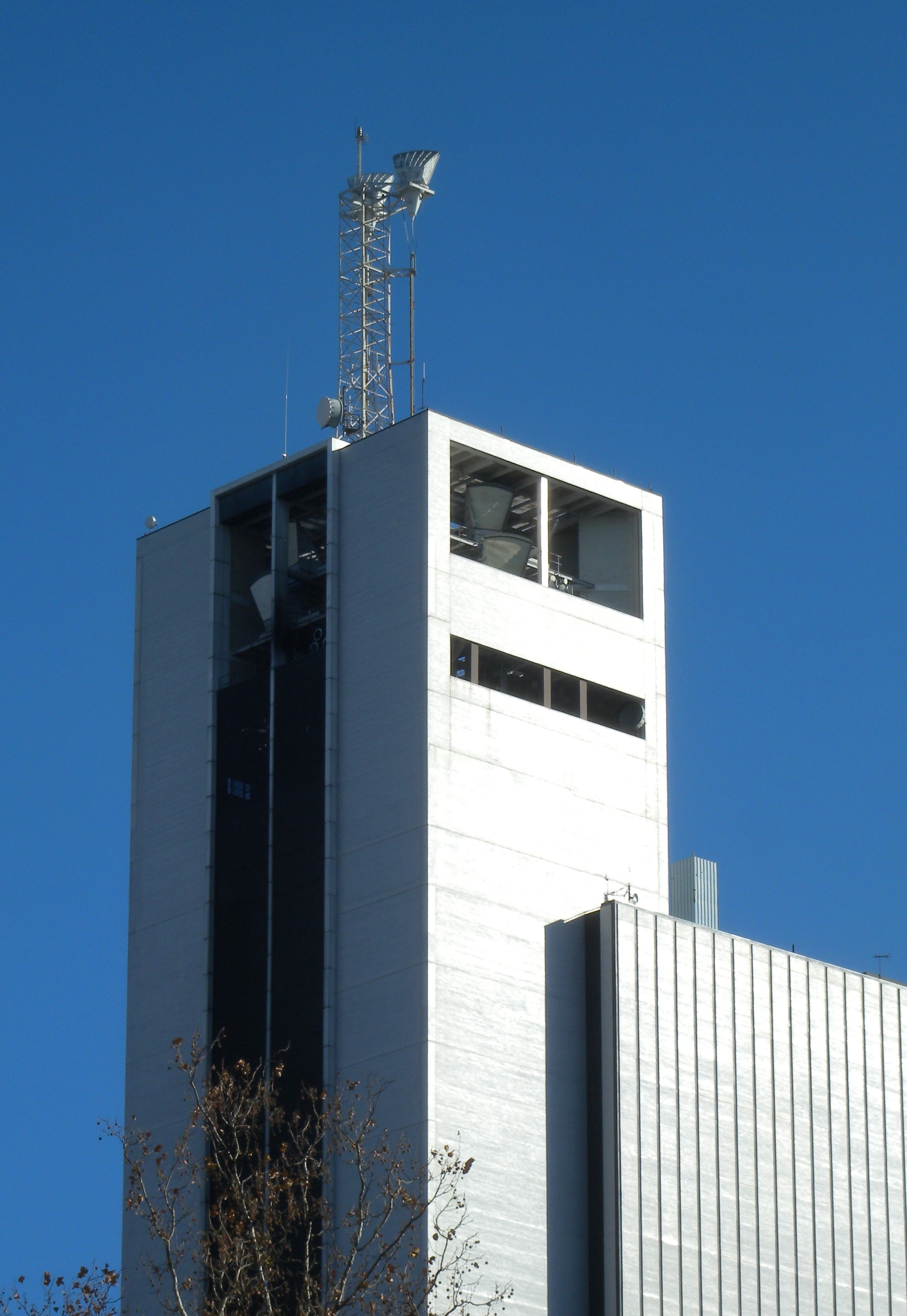
Telephone exchange with later antennas mounted higher for antifade

Antenna diversity, also known as space diversity or spatial diversity, is any one of several wireless diversity schemes that uses two or more antennas to improve the quality and reliability of a wireless link. Often, especially in urban and indoor environments, there is no clear line-of-sight (LOS) between transmitter and receiver. Instead the signal is reflected along multiple paths before finally being received. Each of these bounces can introduce phase shifts, time delays, attenuations, and distortions that can destructively interfere with one another at the aperture of the receiving antenna.

Antenna diversity is especially effective at mitigating these multipath situations. This is because multiple antennas offer a receiver several observations of the same signal. Each antenna will experience a different interference environment. Thus, if one antenna is experiencing a deep fade, it is likely that another has a sufficient signal. Collectively such a system can provide a robust link. While this is primarily seen in receiving systems (diversity reception), the analog has also proven valuable for transmitting systems (transmit diversity) as well.

Inherently an antenna diversity scheme requires additional hardware and integration versus a single antenna system but due to the commonality of the signal paths a fair amount of circuitry can be shared. Also with the multiple signals there is a greater processing demand placed on the receiver, which can lead to tighter design requirements. Typically, however, signal reliability is paramount and using multiple antennas is an effective way to decrease the number of drop-outs and lost connections.

== Antenna techniques ==
Antenna diversity can be realized in several ways. Depending on the environment and the expected interference, designers can employ one or more of these methods to improve signal quality. In fact multiple methods are frequently used to further increase reliability.

- Spatial diversity employs multiple antennas, usually with the same characteristics, that are physically separated from one another. Depending upon the expected incidence of the incoming signal, sometimes a space on the order of a wavelength is sufficient. Other times much larger distances are needed.
  - Macrodiversity is when transmitters are spaced much longer than the wavelength. When the spacing is of the same order or smaller than the wavelength, it is called microdiversity.
  - Cellularization or sectorization, for example, is a spatial diversity scheme that can have antennas or base stations miles apart. This is especially beneficial for the mobile communication industry since it allows multiple users to share a limited communication spectrum and avoid co-channel interference.
- Pattern diversity consists of two or more co-located antennas with different radiation patterns. This type of diversity makes use of directional antennas that are usually physically separated by some (often short) distance. Collectively they are capable of discriminating a large portion of angle space and can provide a higher gain versus a single omnidirectional radiator.
- Polarization diversity combines pairs of antennas with orthogonal polarizations (i.e. horizontal/vertical, ± slant 45°, Left-hand/Right-hand circular polarization etc.). Reflected signals can undergo polarization changes depending on the medium through which they are traveling. A polarization difference of 90° will result in an attenuation factor of up to 34 dB in signal strength. By pairing two complementary polarizations, this scheme can immunize a system from polarization mismatches that would otherwise cause signal fade. Additionally, such diversity has proven valuable at radio and mobile communication base stations since it is less susceptible to the near random orientations of transmitting antennas.
- Transmit/Receive diversity uses two separate, colocated antennas for transmit and receive functions. Such a configuration eliminates the need for a duplexer and can protect sensitive receiver components from the high power used in transmit.
- Adaptive arrays can be a single antenna with active elements or an array of similar antennas with ability to change their combined radiation pattern as different conditions persist. Active electronically scanned arrays (AESAs) manipulate phase shifters and attenuators at the face of each radiating site to provide a near instantaneous scan ability as well as pattern and polarization control. This is especially beneficial for radar applications since it affords a single antenna the ability to switch among several different modes such as searching, tracking, mapping and jamming countermeasures.

== Processing techniques ==
All of the above techniques require some sort of post processing to recover the desired message. Among these techniques are:

- Switching: In a switching receiver, the signal from only one antenna is fed to the receiver for as long as the quality of that signal remains above some prescribed threshold. If and when the signal degrades, another antenna is switched in. Switching is the easiest and least power consuming of the antenna diversity processing techniques but periods of fading and desynchronization may occur while the quality of one antenna degrades and another antenna link is established.
- Selecting: As with switching, selection processing presents only one antenna's signal to the receiver at any given time. The antenna chosen, however, is based on the best signal-to-noise ratio (SNR) among the received signals. This requires that a pre-measurement take place and that all antennas have established connections (at least during the SNR measurement) leading to a higher power requirement. The actual selection process can take place in between received packets of information. This ensures that a single antenna connection is maintained as much as possible. Switching can then take place on a packet-by-packet basis if necessary.
- Combining: In combining, all antennas maintain established connections at all times. The signals are then combined and presented to the receiver. Depending on the sophistication of the system, the signals can be added directly (equal gain combining) or weighted and added coherently (maximal-ratio combining). Such a system provides the greatest resistance to fading but since all the receive paths must remain energized, it also consumes the most power.
- Dynamic Control: Dynamically controlled receivers are capable of choosing from the above processing schemes for whenever the situation arises. While much more complex, they optimize the power vs. performance trade-off. Transitions between modes and/or antenna connections are signaled by a change in the perceived quality of the link. In situations of low fading, the receiver can employ no diversity and use the signal presented by a single antenna. As conditions degrade, the receiver can then assume the more highly reliable but power-hungry modes described above.

== Applications ==
A well-known practical application of diversity reception is in wireless microphones, and in similar electronic devices such as wireless guitar systems. A wireless microphone with a non-diversity receiver (a receiver having only one antenna) is prone to random drop-outs, fades, noise, or other interference, especially if the transmitter (the wireless microphone) is in motion. A wireless microphone or sound system using diversity reception will switch to the other antenna within microseconds if one antenna experiences noise, providing an improved quality signal with fewer drop-outs and noise. Ideally, no drop-outs or noise will occur in the received signal.

Another common usage is in Wi-Fi networking gear and cordless telephones to compensate for multipath interference. The base station will switch reception to one of two antennas depending on which is currently receiving a stronger signal. For best results, the antennas are usually placed one wavelength apart. For microwave bands, where the wavelengths are under 100 cm, this can often be done with two antennas attached to the same hardware. For lower frequencies and longer wavelengths, the antennas must be several meters apart, making it much less reasonable.

Mobile phone towers also often take advantage of diversity - each face (sector) of a tower will often have two antennas; one is transmitting and receiving, while the other is a receive only antenna. Two receivers are used to perform diversity reception.

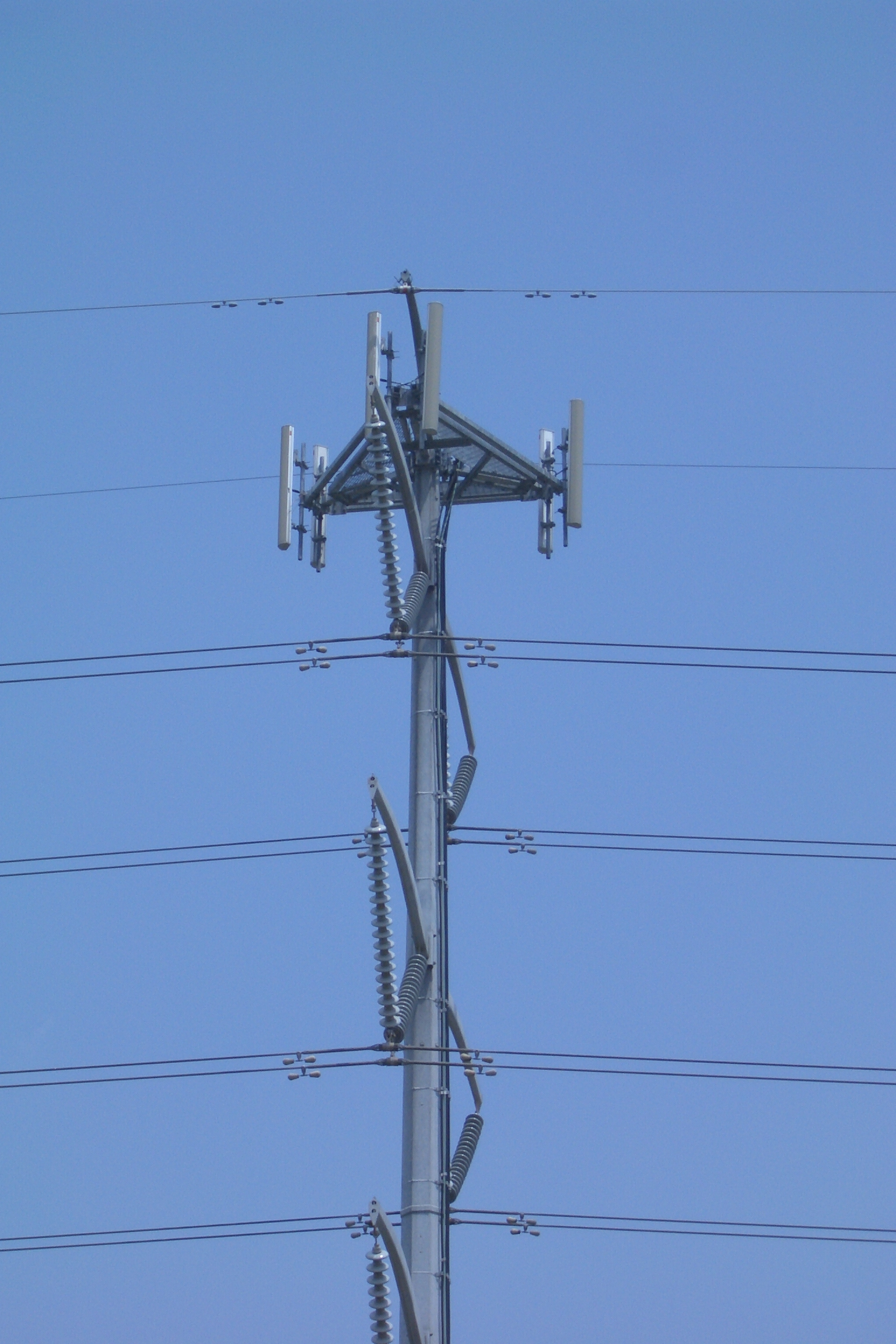
Cell antennas on an electricity pylon showing two antennas per sector

The use of multiple antennas at both transmit and receive results in a multiple-input multiple-output (MIMO) system. The use of diversity techniques at both ends of the link is termed space–time coding.

== Antenna diversity for MIMO ==
Diversity Coding is the spatial coding techniques for a MIMO system in wireless channels. Wireless channels severely suffer from fading phenomena, which causes unreliability in data decoding. Fundamentally, diversity coding sends multiple copies through multiple transmit antennas, so as to improve the reliability of the data reception. If one of them fails to receive, the others are used for data decoding. MIMO achieves spatial diversity and spatial multiplexing.

== See also ==
- Diversity scheme
- Space–time code
- Rake receiver
- Multiple-input multiple-output communications (MIMO)
- Distributed antenna system
- Macro diversity
- Diversity combining
- Transmit diversity
- Diversity gain
- Cooperative diversity
