= List of companies headquartered in Northern Virginia =

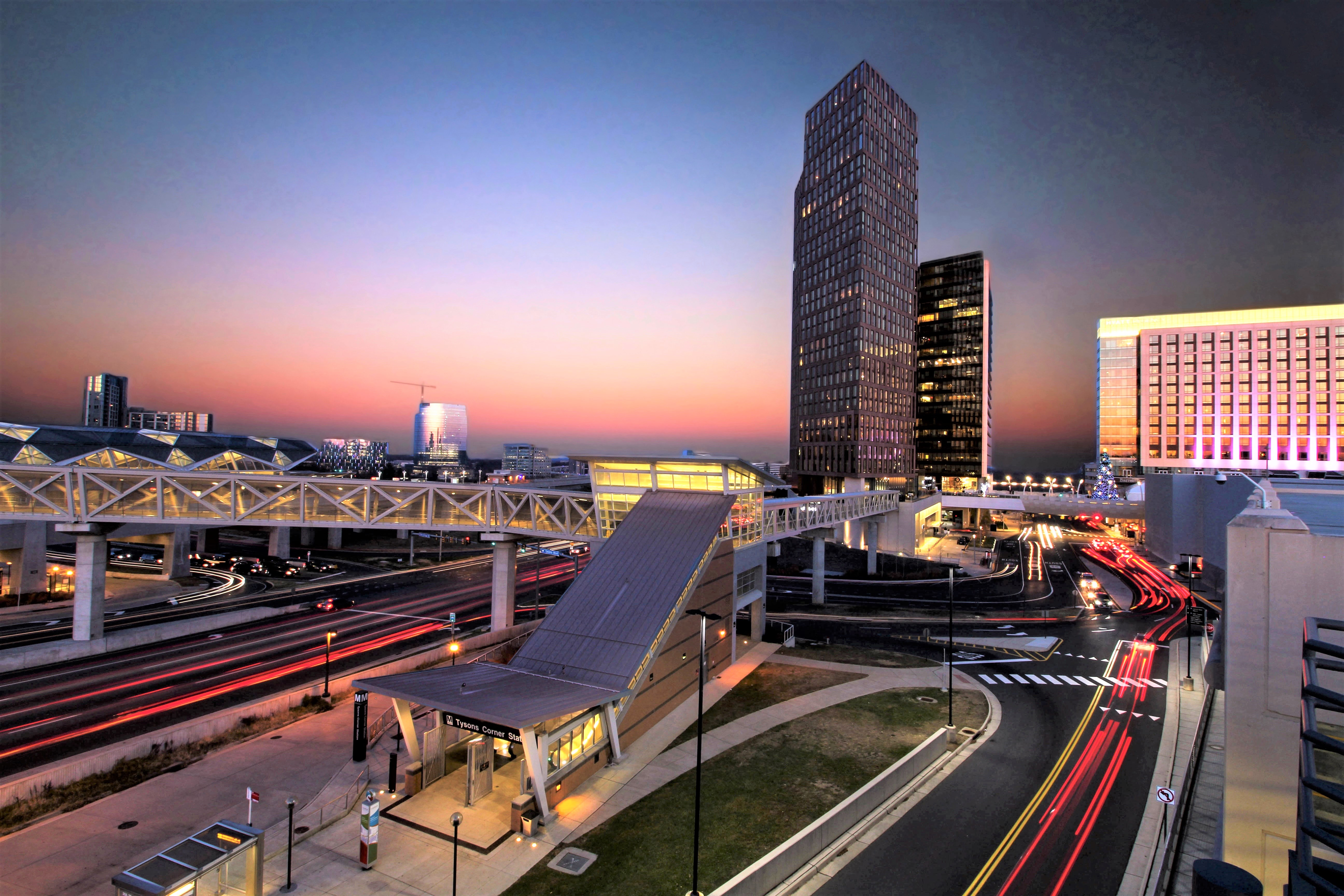
Tysons Corner has more Fortune 500 company headquarters than Washington, D.C.

This is a list of notable companies headquartered in Northern Virginia. The majority of the following companies are located in Fairfax County and Loudoun County the most populous jurisdictions in Northern Virginia, Virginia state, and the Baltimore-Washington metropolitan area. Companies with a McLean or Vienna address are often located in Tysons Corner; "Tysons Corner" was not available as a postal address until 2011.

== Communications ==
- Iridium Communications (McLean)
- Morcom International, Inc. (Chantilly)
- NeuStar (Sterling)
- NII Holdings (Reston)
- OneWeb (Arlington)
- SkyTerra (Reston)
- SpaceQuest, Ltd. (Fairfax)
- t/Space (Reston)
- Transmitter Location Systems (Chantilly)
- XO Communications (Herndon)

== Consumer goods ==
M&M's, one of several lines of snacks made by Mars, Incorporated

- Alpha Industries (Chantilly)
- Aspetto (Fredericksburg)
- Bare International (Fairfax)
- Custom Ink (Fairfax)
- Five Guys (Alexandria)
- Mars, Incorporated (McLean)
- Nestle USA (Arlington)
- ThinkGeek (Fairfax)

== Education ==
- Stride, Inc. (Herndon)
- Meridian Knowledge Solutions (Reston)
- Strayer University (Herndon)
- The Teaching Company (Chantilly)

== Energy ==
- AES Corporation (Arlington)
- Touchstone Energy (Arlington)

== Finance ==
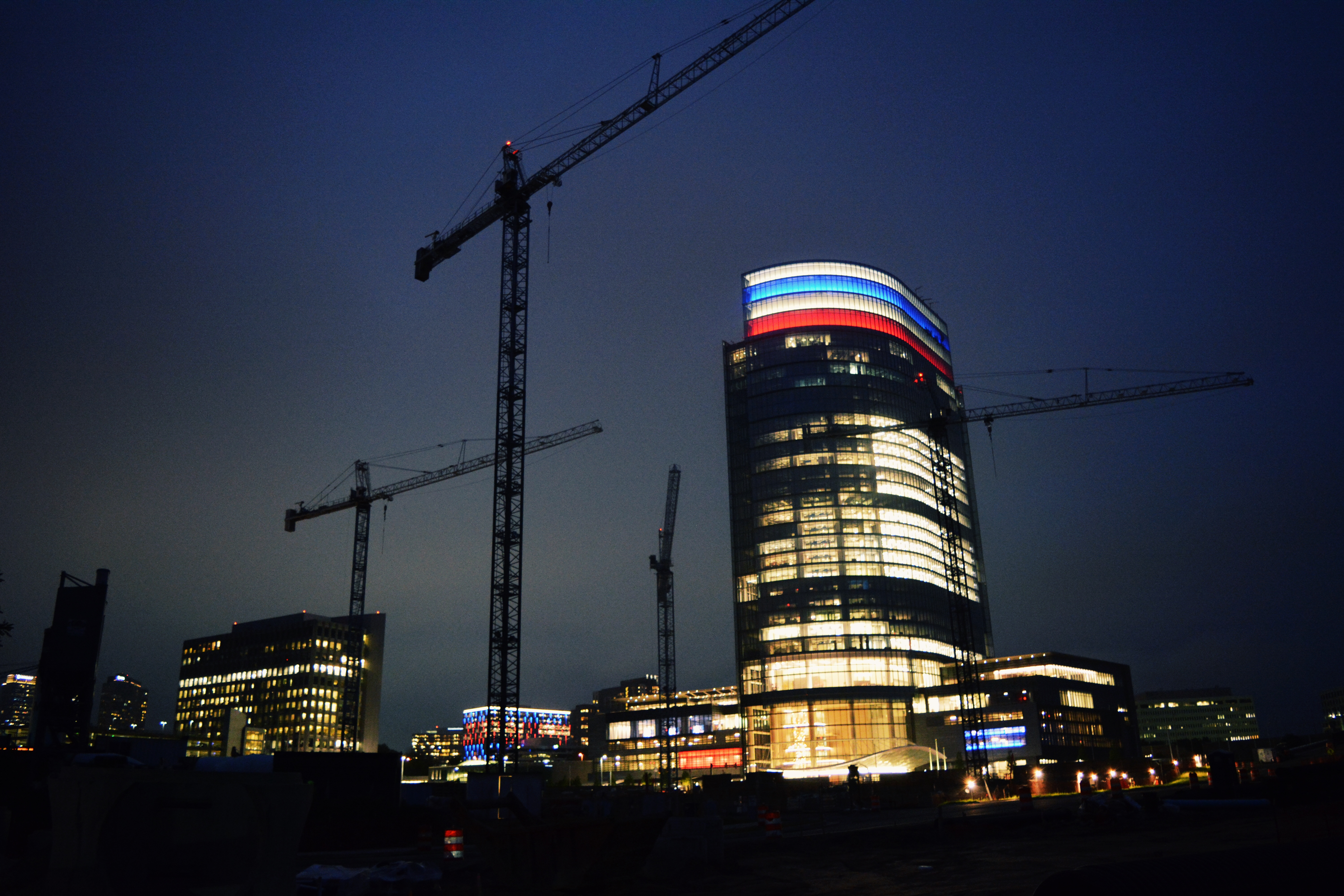
The Capital One Tower in Tysons is the tallest habitable building the Washington region.

- Arlington Asset Investment (Arlington)
- Capital One (McLean)
- E-Trade (Arlington)
- FBR Capital Markets (Arlington)
- Freddie Mac (McLean)
- Navy Federal Credit Union (Vienna)
- Strategic Investment Group (Arlington)

== Government contractors ==
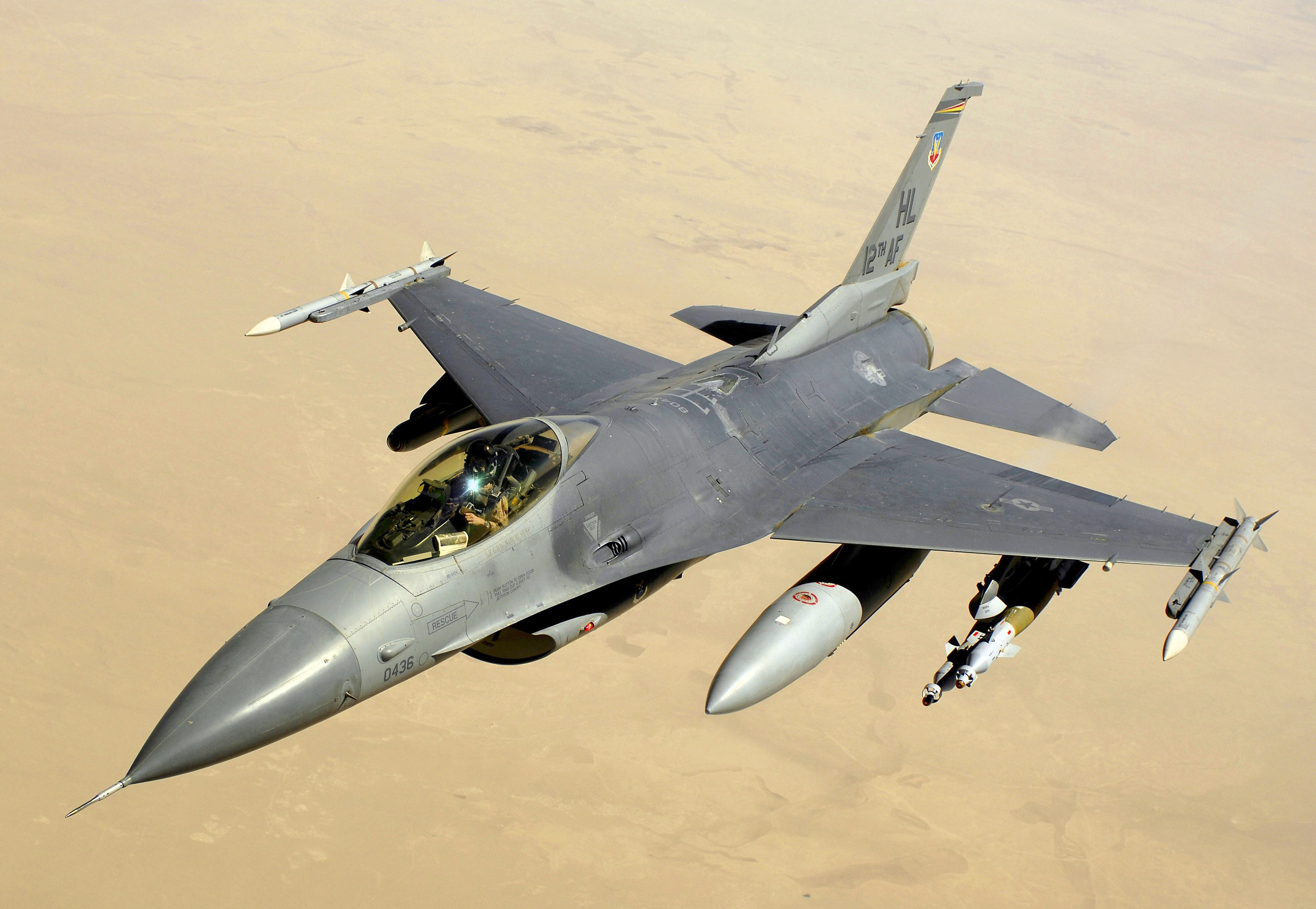
The General Dynamics F-16, originally designed in the 1970s, is still in use by air forces around the world.

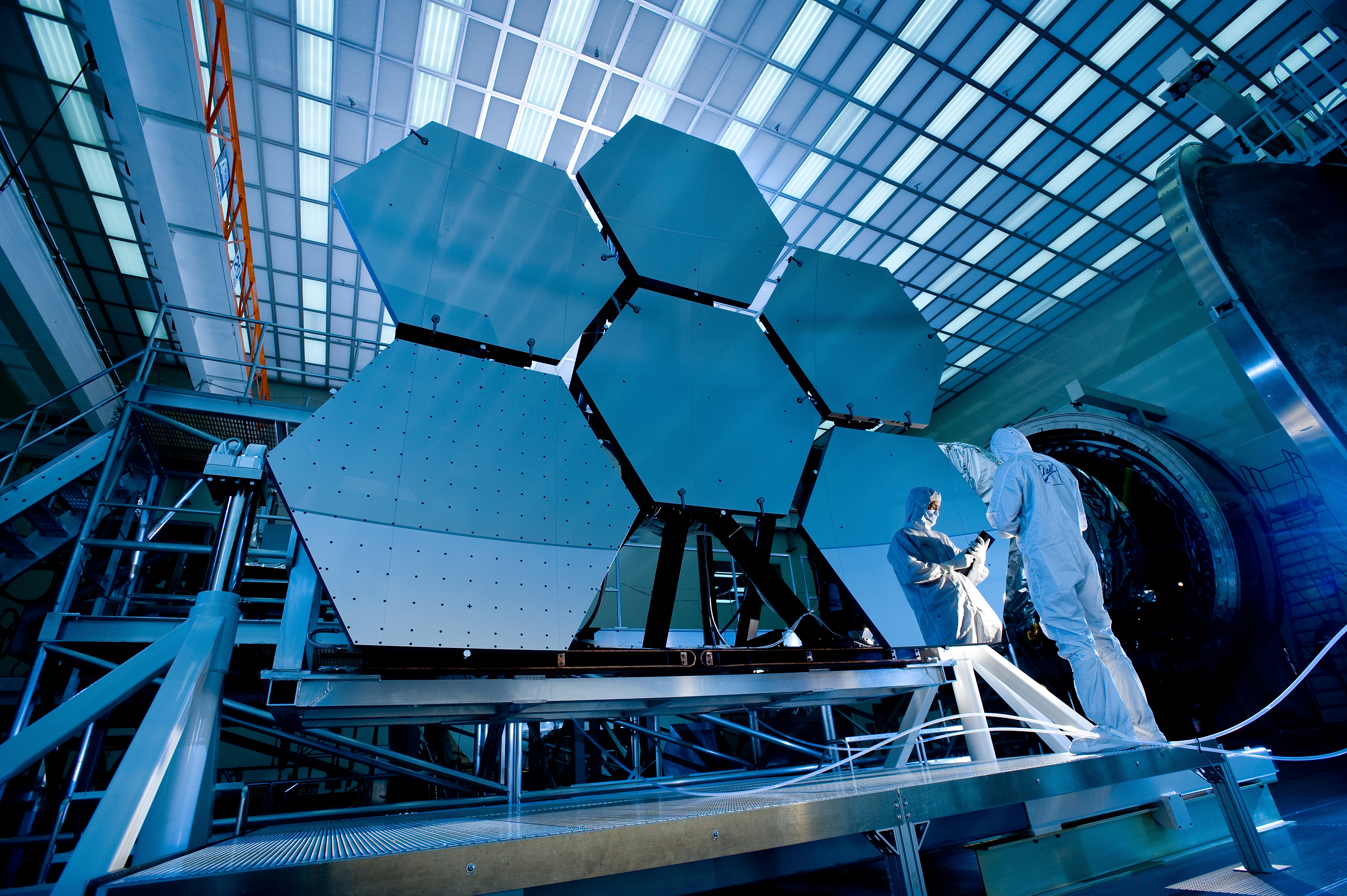
Northrop Grumman is the primary contractor for the James Webb Space Telescope, the successor to the Hubble Space Telescope and Spitzer Space Telescope.

Government contracting companies (including defense contracting companies) may be involved in various fields, such as financial services, healthcare, information technology, mercenaries, science, and space technology, sometimes all within the same company. Some of the following companies may only derive a minority of their income from government contracting, but are listed here for organizational purposes.

- Academi (Reston)
- Accenture (Arlington)
- AeroVironment (Arlington)
- The Analysis Corporation (McLean)
- Argon ST (Fairfax)
- Booz Allen Hamilton Holding Corp. (McLean)
- CACI (Arlington)
- Carahsoft (Reston)
- Computer Sciences Corporation (Falls Church)
- CSRA (Falls Church)
- Delta Tucker Holdings, Inc. (owner of DynCorp International) (Falls Church)
- Edge Technologies (Fairfax)
- Endgame, Inc. (Arlington)
- Exelis Inc. (McLean)
- General Dynamics (Falls Church)
- Kellogg Brown and Root Services (Arlington)
- Kiewit Federal Group Inc. (Arlington)
- Leidos Holdings Inc. (Reston)
- Mandiant (Alexandria)
- ManTech International (Herndon)
- Maximus Inc. (Reston)
- Military Professional Resources (Alexandria)
- MVM, Inc. (Ashburn)
- NJVC (Chantilly)
- Nortel Government Solutions (Fairfax)
- Northrop Grumman (Falls Church)
- Optimized Systems & Solutions (Reston)
- Parsons Corporation (Chantilly, Virginia)
- Peraton (Herndon)
- Rannoch Corp. (Alexandria)
- Salient CRGT (Fairfax)
- SAIC (McLean)
- Stanley (Alexandria)
- System Planning Corporation (Arlington)
- Technology Service Corporation (Arlington)
- Triple Canopy, Inc. (Herndon)
- Vinnell (Fairfax)

== Internet technology and software ==
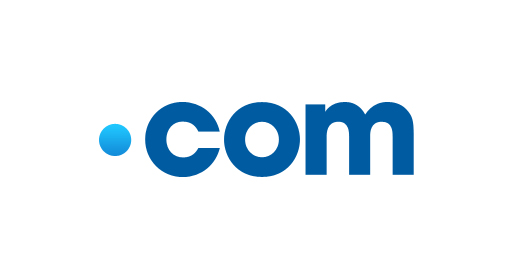
.com is one of several top-level domains operated by Verisign.

- Amazon (Arlington)
- AppAssure Software (Reston)
- Appian Corporation (McLean)
- Applied Predictive Technologies (Arlington)
- BookLender (Vienna)
- Capitol Advantage (Fairfax)
- ComScore (Reston)
- Cvent (Tysons Corner)
- Geeknet (Fairfax)
- Logi Analytics (McLean)
- MicroStrategy (McLean)
- Motley Fool (Alexandria)
- Objective Interface Systems (Herndon)
- Opower (Arlington)
- Rosetta Stone (Arlington)
- ScienceLogic (Reston)
- StreetShares (Reston)
- ServInt (McLean)
- Siteworx (Reston)
- Sogosurvey (Herndon)
- ThinkFun (Alexandria)
- Verisign (Reston)
- Vision III Imaging, Inc. (Vienna)
- Wrong Planet (Fairfax)
- Walmart Labs (Reston)

== Media ==
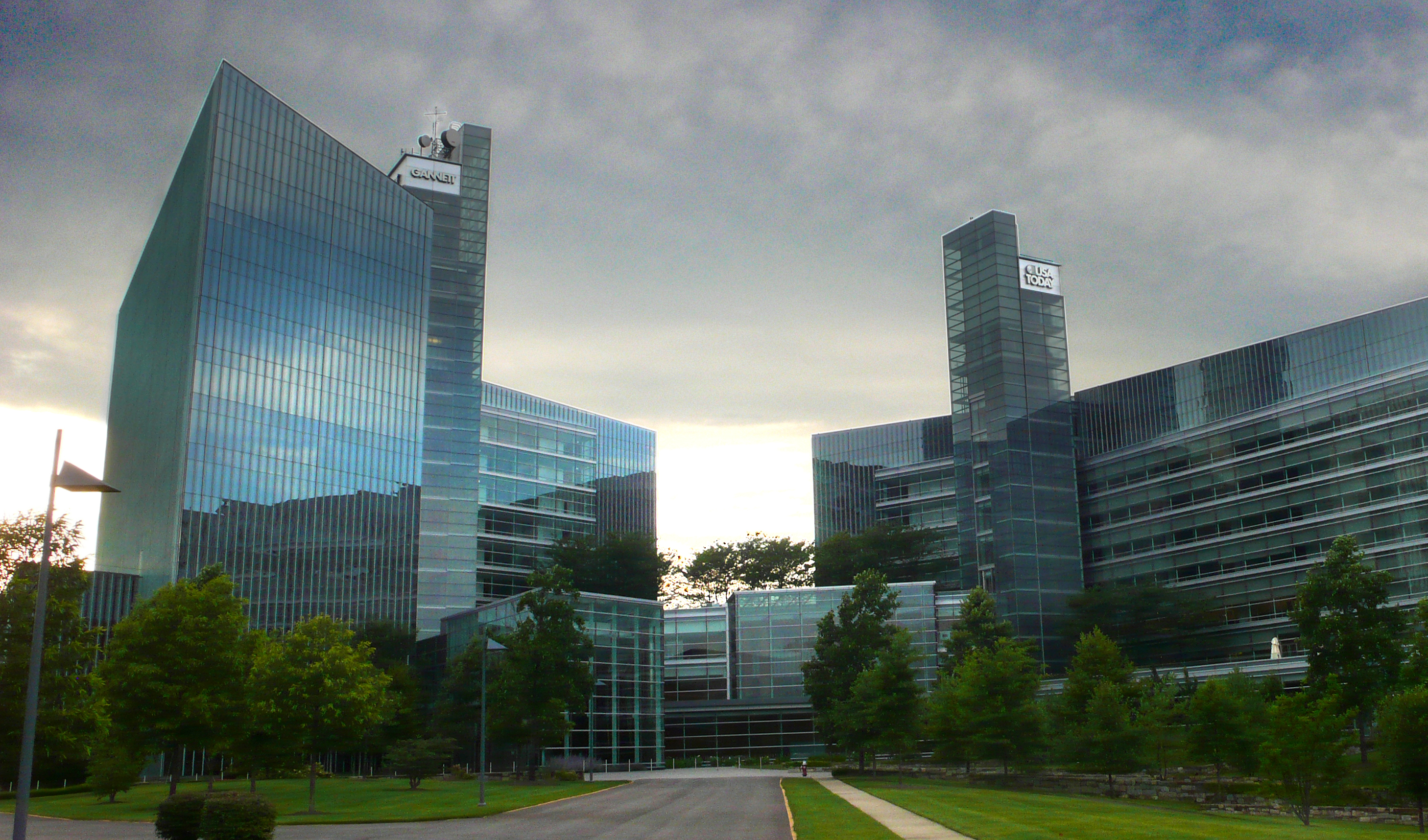
Gannett Company is the largest newspaper publisher in the nation, and the largest owner of CBS and NBC affiliate TV stations.

- Alhurra (Springfield)
- Gannett Company (McLean)
- Graham Holdings Company (Arlington)
- Politico (Arlington)
- Tegna, Inc. (Tysons Corner)
- USA Today (McLean)
- Washington Business Journal (Arlington)

== Professional services ==
- Alcalde & Fay (Arlington)
- Bloomberg BNA (Arlington)
- DXC Technology (Ashburn)
- Oblon, Spivak, McClelland, Maier & Neustadt (Alexandria)
- Corporate Executive Board (Arlington)
- Willis Towers Watson (Arlington)

== Real estate and hospitality ==
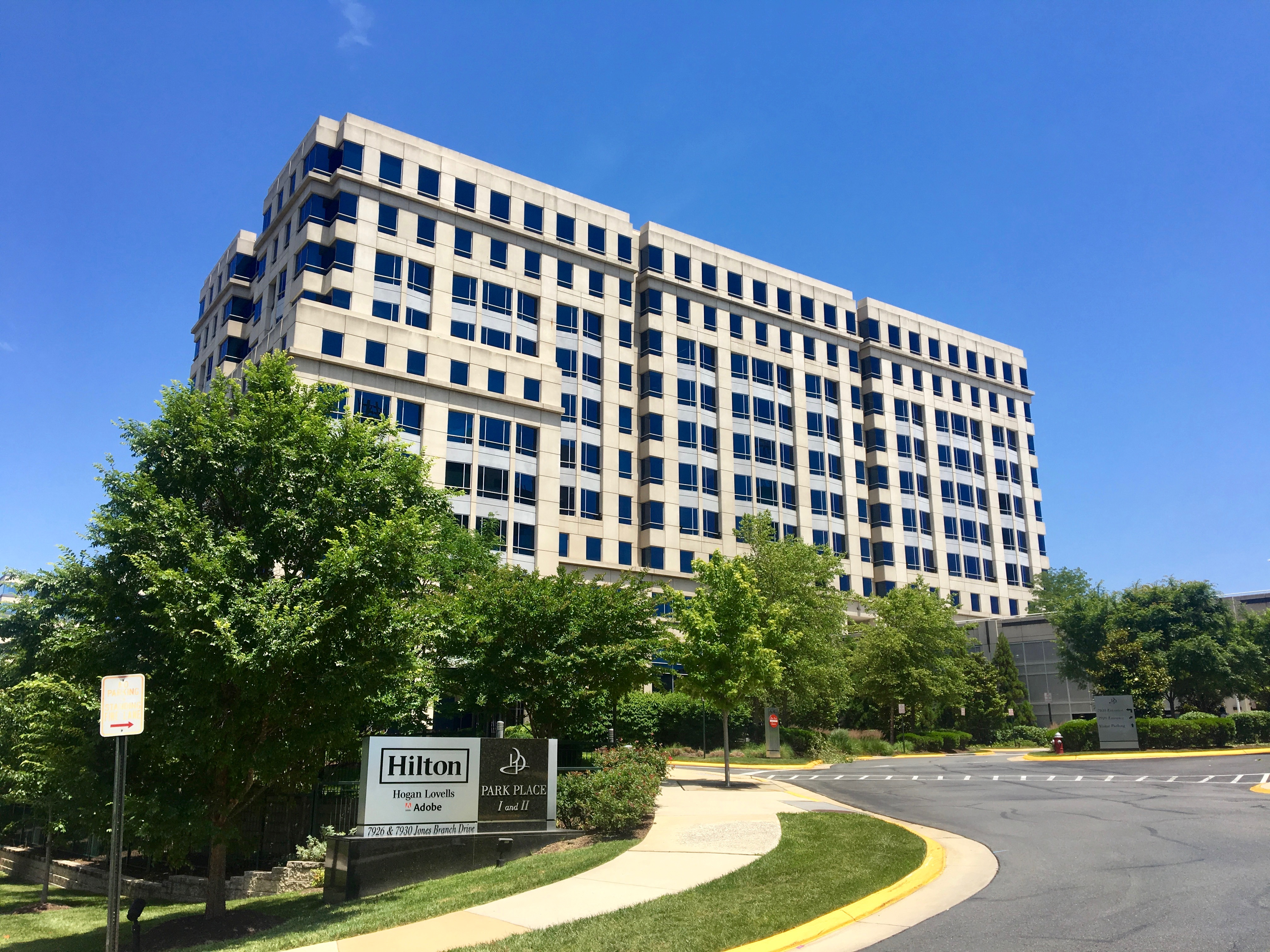
Hilton Worldwide manages over 750,000 hotel rooms.

- Beacon Roofing Supply, Inc. (Herndon)
- Interstate Hotels & Resorts (Arlington)
- Hilton Worldwide (McLean)
- Long & Foster (Chantilly)
- MakeOffices (McLean)
- NVR, Inc. (Reston)
- Sunrise Senior Living (McLean)

== Transportation ==
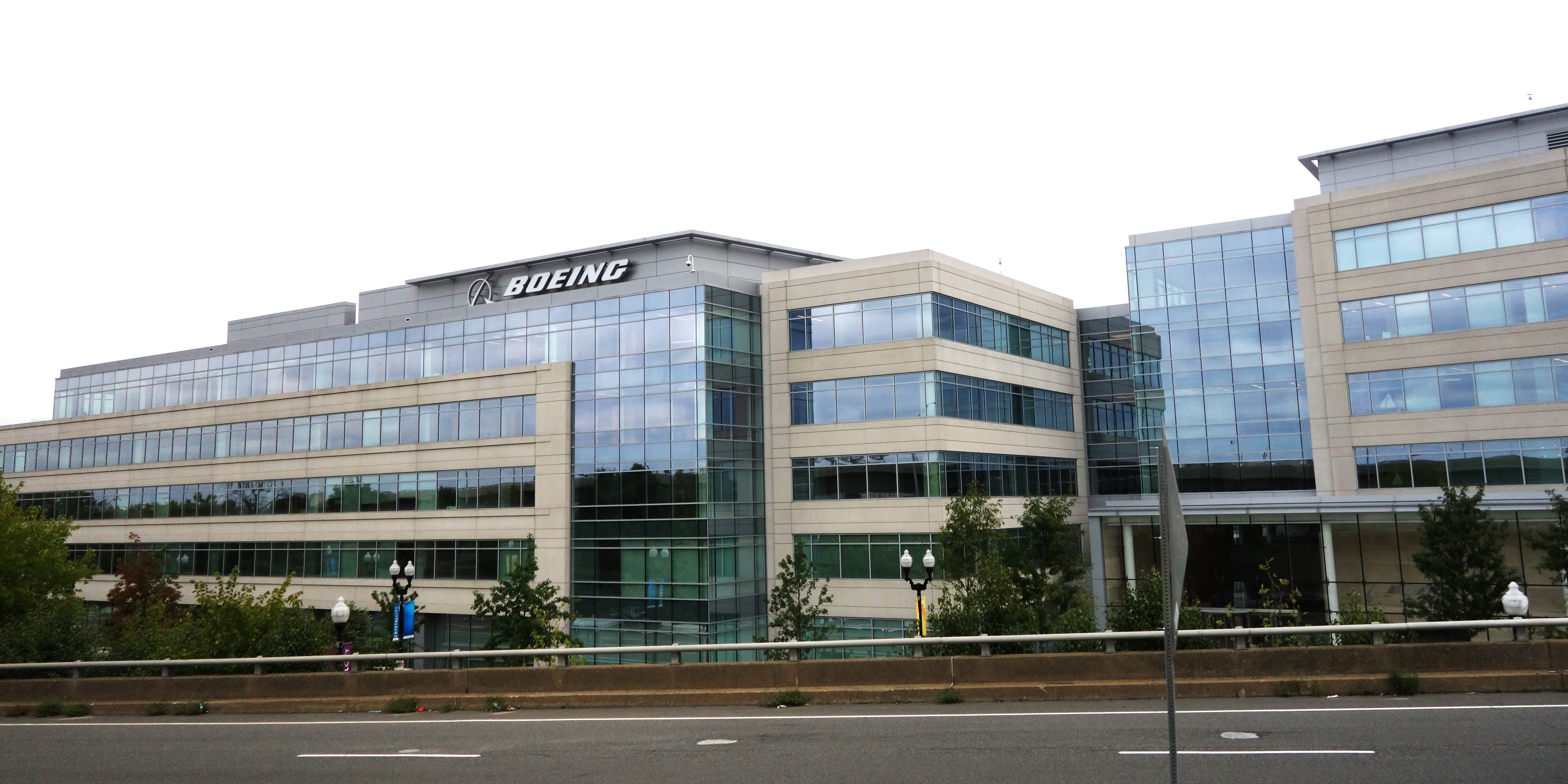
Headquarters of Boeing in Crystal City, Virginia

- Boeing (Arlington)
- Interstate Van Lines (Springfield)
- Robinson Terminal (Alexandria)
- Space Adventures (Vienna)
- Trailways Transportation System (Fairfax)

== Non-profit ==
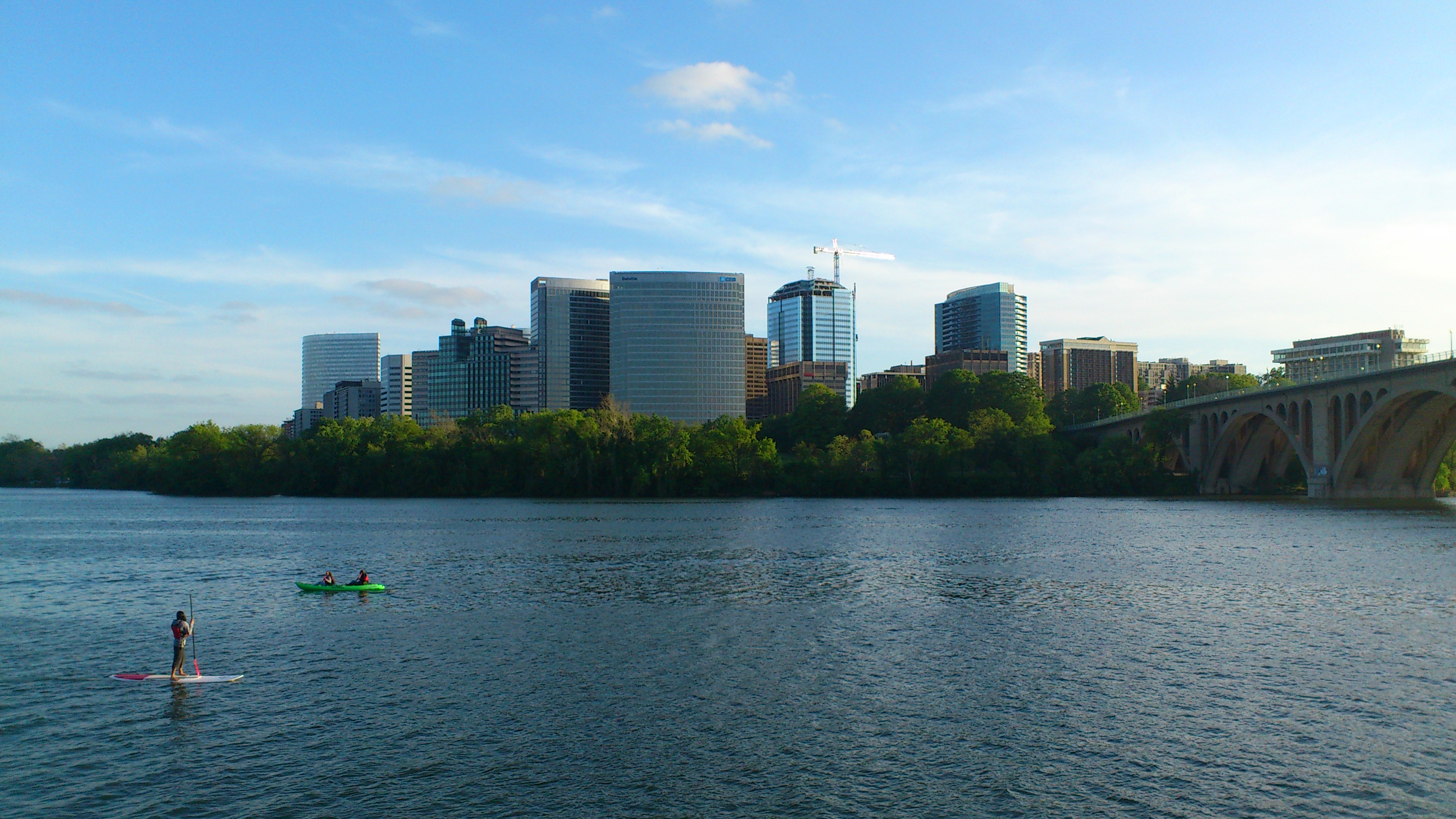
Many of the region's non-profit organizations are based in Arlington.

Professional/trade organizations

- Air Force Association (Arlington)
- Aluminum Association (Arlington)
- American Anthropological Association (Arlington)
- American Optometric Association (Alexandria)
- American Society for Radiation Oncology (Fairfax)
- Association for Manufacturing Technology (McLean)
- Consumer Electronics Association (Arlington)
- Graduate Management Admission Council (Reston)
- Grocery Manufacturers Association (Arlington)
- Helicopter Association International (Alexandria)
- Infectious Diseases Society of America (Arlington)
- Intelligence and National Security Alliance (Arlington)
- National Association of Convenience Stores (Alexandria)
- National Automobile Dealers Association (McLean)
- National Rifle Association of America (Fairfax)
- National Science Teachers Association (Arlington)
- Purple Heart Foundation (Annandale)
- Tragedy Assistance Program for Survivors (Arlington)
- United States Geospatial Intelligence Foundation (Herndon)

=== Think tanks ===
- American Civil Rights Union (Alexandria)
- Center for Climate and Energy Solutions (Arlington)
- Center for Freedom and Prosperity (Alexandria)
- Center for International Relations (Arlington)
- Concord Coalition (Arlington)
- Feminist Majority Foundation (Arlington)
- George C. Marshall Institute (Arlington)
- Institute for Defense Analyses (Alexandria)
- Lexington Institute (Arlington)
- Mercatus Center (Arlington)
- National Policy Institute (Arlington)
- Potomac Institute for Policy Studies (Arlington)
- State Policy Network (Arlington)

=== Financial ===
- In-Q-Tel (Arlington)
- Navy Federal Credit Union (Vienna)
- Pentagon Federal Credit Union (McLean)

=== Internet ===
- American Registry for Internet Numbers (Chantilly)
- Internet Society (Reston)
- Public Interest Registry (Reston)

=== Other ===
- BBB National Programs (Tysons)
- CNA Corporation (Arlington)
- Inova Health System (Falls Church)
- Legal Aid Justice Center (Falls Church)
- Mitre Corporation (McLean)
- National Council on Aging (Arlington)
- Noblis (Reston)
- PBS (Arlington)

== Foreign companies ==
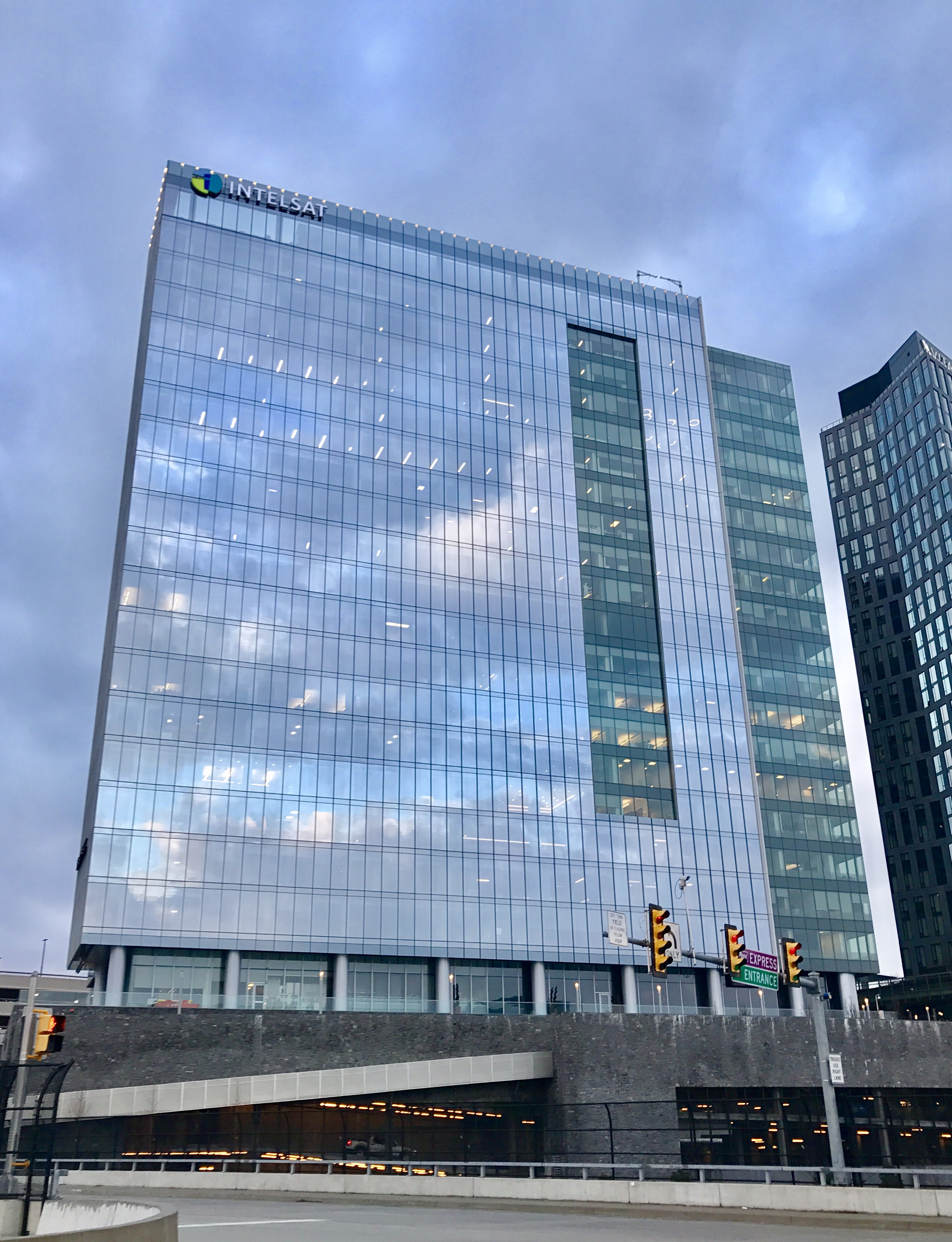
Intelsat's administrative headquarters in Tysons

These are companies based outside the U.S. with a division headquartered in Northern Virginia.

- Airbus Group, Inc. (France) (Herndon)
- BAE Systems Customer Solutions (United Kingdom) (Arlington)
- Dynamotive USA (Canada) (McLean)
- FNH USA (Belgium) (Fredericksburg)
- Heckler & Koch Inc. (Germany) (Ashburn)
- Intelsat Corporation (Luxembourg) (Tysons)
- Lafarge North America (France) (Herndon)
- Lidl (Germany) (Arlington)
- Mitsubishi Nuclear Energy Systems Inc. (Japan) (Arlington)
- Nestlé USA (Switzerland) (Arlington)
- Gerber Products Company (Arlington)
- NTT DATA (Japan) (Herndon)
- QinetiQ North America (United Kingdom) (McLean)
- Rolls-Royce North America (United Kingdom) (Reston)
- Saab Aerotech of America LLC (Sweden) (Sterling)
- Transurban USA Inc (Australia) (Springfield)
- Volkswagen Group of America (Germany) (Herndon)

== Regional Offices ==
The following companies have major regional offices located in the Dulles Technology Corridor:

- Accenture
- Adobe Systems
- AgustaWestland
- Amazon Web Services
- Amdocs
- Airbus
- Oath (AOL/Yahoo!)
- AT&T
- BAE Systems
- CA, Inc.
- Capgemini
- CDW
- Charter Communications
- Cisco Systems
- Cox Communications
- Dell
- Deloitte
- Discovery, Inc.
- Warner Bros. Discovery
- EMC Corporation
- Equinix
- ESRI
- ExxonMobil
- Fairchild Dornier
- FireEye
- Google
- Harris Corporation
- Hewlett-Packard
- Hewlett Packard Enterprise
- Juniper Networks
- IBM
- L-3 Communications
- Lockheed Martin
- Microsoft
- Nestle
- NEC
- NetApp
- Nissan Motors
- Nutanix
- Oracle Corporation
- Palo Alto Networks
- Perot Systems
- Raytheon
- Red Hat
- Rockwell Collins
- Rolls-Royce North America
- Salesforce.com
- Siemens
- Sprint Nextel
- Symantec
- Tata Communications
- Terremark
- Time Warner Cable
- Unisys
- Visa Inc.
- Verizon
- VMware

== See also ==
- List of federal agencies in Northern Virginia
- List of space companies and facilities in Virginia
