= Morcom =

Morcom may refer to:

- Christopher Morcom (1911–1930), a childhood friend of Alan Turing
- Samuel Morcom (c. 1847–1888), Cornish-born South Australian cricketer
- Morcom International
- Morcom Township, St. Louis County, Minnesota
