= List of space companies and facilities in Virginia =

The following are current and former agencies, companies, and facilities in Virginia with significant space-related activity.

== Northern Virginia ==
=== Government agencies ===
- DARPA (Defense Advanced Research Projects Agency)
- National Geospatial-Intelligence Agency (NGA)
- National Reconnaissance Office (NRO)
- National Security Space Office
- Space Development Agency (SDA)
- United States Space Force (USSF)

=== Companies ===
- Boeing
- GeoEye
- Iridium Communications
- Intelsat US
- Northrop Grumman
- Orbital Sciences Corporation
- RTX Corporation
- Space Adventures
- SpaceQuest, Ltd.
- SAIC
- SkyTerra
- t/Space
- TerreStar Corporation
- Transmitter Location Systems

== Hampton Roads ==
=== Government agencies and installations ===
- NASA Langley Research Center
- NASA Wallops Flight Facility
- Virginia Spaceport Authority - formerly Virginia Commercial Space Flight Authority

=== Commercial installations ===
- Mid-Atlantic Regional Spaceport (MARS) - formerly Virginia Space Flight Center

== See also ==
- List of companies headquartered in Northern Virginia
- List of federal agencies in Northern Virginia
