= Federal News Service =

Transcription services company

Federal News Service (FNS) is a Washington, D.C.–based company providing transcription services. FNS produces on-demand verbatim transcripts of newsworthy events in DC (including speeches, congressional hearings, and interviews) for its clients. FNS "is one of the chief sources of transcripts from presidential appearances and Capitol Hill events".

== History ==
FNS was incorporated in 1985. Before the creation of FNS, many years "the only way to find out what exactly was said at a Washington hearing or briefing was to be there. Harried journalists, lawyers and Government staff workers dashed from session to session, then relied on scribbled notes and individual tape recordings to reconstruct what happened." The creation of the Federal News Service filled a market niche; The New York Times' wrote in 1987 that "this high-technology transcription company with a low public profile has quickly, and quietly, made itself indispensable to news organizations, many branches of Government and even foreign governments by covering news conferences, briefings and other sessions among Washington's comment mills: the press offices and public affairs offices of the departments of State and Defense, the White House, Congress and television talk shows."

Im December 1995, the Federal Trade Commission approved a consent agreement with the Reuters America unit of Reuters Holdings P.L.C. and with Federal News Service Group Inc. This agreement settled charges that the two firm, the United States' largest producers of verbatim transcripts, had an anti-competitive agreement. Under the agreement, no party admitted any wrongdoing.

In July 2009, FNS filed a lawsuit in federal court in Washington against Congressional Quarterly, as well as CQ's then-parent companies (the Times Publishing Company and the Poynter Institute for Media Studies), CQ's subsidiary CQ Transcriptions, and a CQ vendor, Morningside Partners. FNS accused CQ of corporate espionage, alleging in court documents that CQ had paid a FSN employee to provide it with confidential business information and that CQ had used a customer password to access FNS transcripts.

In August 2010, it was reported that FNS had been purchased by the Minnesota-based Dolan Company, a publisher of business journals and trade media. Dolan purchased FNS from the trustee of the bankruptcy estate of FNS's former owner, Cheryl A. Reagan.

On December 1, 2014, CQ Roll Call announced that it was acquiring FNS from Dolan for an undisclosed sum. CQ Roll Call is a wholly owned subsidiary of The Economist Group and was formed from the merger of Congressional Quarterly, Roll Call, and Capitol Advantage.
