= Satellite geolocation =

Satellite geolocation is the process of locating the origin of a signal appearing on a satellite communication channel. Typically, this process is used to mitigate interference on communication satellites. Usually, these interference signals are caused by human error or equipment failure, but can also be caused by deliberate jamming. Identifying the geographical location of an interfering signal informs the mitigation activity.

== How satellite geolocation works ==
Many communication satellites share a given frequency band. As a signal is transmitted to a particular satellite there is some amount of side lobe or spillover energy that is transmitted to adjacent satellites. At a receive station that has two antennas, one pointed at the primary satellite (the satellite the signal is intended for) and a secondary satellite (a satellite that is receiving side lobe energy), both paths of the signal are received and measured. From a comparison of those paths, two measurements can be made: Differential Time Offset (DTO) and Differential Frequency Offset (DFO). These measurements are often implemented through correlation processing. DTO represents the difference in time that it takes the signal to travel through the two satellites, while DFO represents the difference in frequency the received signals present through the two satellites. The frequency differences observed are due to different Doppler shift resulting from relative satellite motion and differences in the translation frequencies of the two satellite channels. Channel translation frequencies and downlink Doppler shift and delay can be calibrated out of the measurements by observing transmitters of known location simultaneously on the channels. This leaves the uplink DTO and DFO as the observables. See 'Reference Signals' below.

=== Lines of position ===
Once a DTO calculated, it can be combined with the known position of the satellites and the receiving station. This combination provides a locus of positions on the Earth’s surface for the source of the signal; from this result a line of position (LOP) can be derived. A similar line can be derived for the frequency differences. Where the two LOPs intersect is the signal transmission location. In addition to geolocation with a time LOP and a frequency LOP, a location can also be determined by finding the crossing point of two time LOPs. The second time LOP is an identical measurement using a different secondary satellite, or using the same secondary satellite, but later in time. Similarly, two frequency LOPs can be used to determine a location. It can be shown that, in general, it is expected that the two LOPs intersect in two places. In many circumstances it is possible to discount one of the intersections e.g. due to it not being in the coverage area of one or both satellites. In some circumstances, it is not possible to distinguish intersections from a pair of LOPs, in which case, additional LOPs need to be determined.

=== Reference signals ===
While measuring the DTO and DFO will give you an idea of the location of the signal source, the location will be inaccurate. There are many biases within the measurement system that, if not accounted for properly, will manifest themselves as time delays or frequency offsets. For example, while a satellite translation frequency is known to within a few kHz, accurate geolocation requires frequency measurement accuracies of single mHz.

In order to determine the position of signal source, a second set of measurements is required. Typically, this is done by making DTO and DFO measurements for a reference signal simultaneous with the target signal measurement. The measurement of the reference signal is purely passive and simply serves to remove the biases in the system. The same measurements that are made for the target signal, DTO and DFO, are made for the reference signal. The key to a reference signal is that the transmit location of that signal is known. By comparing the DTO of the reference signal and the DTO of the target signal a result known as Time Difference of Arrival (TDOA) can be calculated. Likewise, from the DFO of the target and the DFO of the reference signal, a Frequency Difference of Arrival (FDOA) can be determined. The TDOA and FDOA results provide a finite number of locations on the Earth’s surface, and therefore, lines of position (LOPs) are determined from the TDOA and FDOA results.

A limitation as to how accurately a location can be obtained is knowledge of the satellites' positions and velocities generated by the satellite ephemerides (orbit descriptors). A single reference geographically close to the target will give a high degree of cancellation of the location effects of ephemeris error. Measurements on signals from multiple reference sites can be used to improve the accuracy of the satellite ephemerides thereby provided improved geolocation accuracy generally.

== Various geolocation methods ==
TDOA and FDOA results can be gathered and combined in various methods to produce geolocation results. Each method has its advantages and disadvantages in different measurement scenarios.

Animation showing the relationship between TDOA and FDOA lines with respect to satellite motion over a 24-hour period. Note the limited movement of the TDOA lines compared with the drastic movement of the FDOA lines.

=== TDOA-TDOA geolocation ===
TDOA-TDOA geolocation is performed, generally, by measuring DTO values using two secondary satellites, or three total satellites. By doing this, two TDOA lines are generated, hopefully, with a crossing point. TDOA – TDOA geolocation is ideal for moving targets, since the movement of the target will introduce varying and random frequency changes, causing an FDOA result to be useless, unless obtained from a highly inclined satellite. TDOA-TDOA geolocation will not work for unmodulated signals. Due to the repetitive nature of the signal, no unique TDOA solution will exist. One problem with using only TDOA lines of position is that they tend to be north-south orientated and close to parallel, so that the “crossing point” of a TDOA-TDOA measurement can be error prone and uncertain, as it is “hidden” in a long intersection of the lines. Care is also necessary in interpreting the results from moving targets if the two TDOA observations are not obtained simultaneously since the target will have moved between observations.

=== FDOA-FDOA geolocation ===
FDOA-FDOA geolocation is accomplished by using three satellites, or by using time separated measurements on two satellites. The time separation can be as little as 5 minutes or as much as an hour or more. Again, the two FDOA lines are used to find a crossing point, or target location. FDOA-FDOA geolocation is necessary for CW signals. Geolocation on highly inclined satellites, either one of both being used in the measurement, will result in more accurate results by performing FDOA – FDOA geolocation. This is due to a large difference in relative motion, leading to a large difference in relative frequency between the two satellites. A related point is the error to FDOA-FDOA calculation contributed by ephemeris uncertainty is relatively small. Moving targets are not likely to be located using FDOA methods, unless using a highly inclined satellite. FDOA – FDOA geolocation has an interesting weakness in that for some amount of time per day, the two satellites used have very little differential frequency. This is due to the cyclical movement of the satellites. During those periods, FDOA measurements will not be ideal. In addition, the small amount of frequency difference being measured is much harder to accurately measure than the time differences.

=== TDOA-FDOA geolocation ===
TDOA-FDOA geolocation, in most scenarios, gives ideal results. By combining time lines, which, generally, are oriented north-south, and frequency lines, which, generally, are orientated east-west, you get a nearly perpendicular crossing. A perpendicular crossing means less uncertainty in the calculated location. TDOA-FDOA geolocation also has an interesting limitation in that there are generally two times per day, separated by around 12 hours, where the FDOA becomes very small and hard to relate to an accurate LOP. These times can be calculated based on known satellite ephemeris information and approximate transmitter location, and can therefore be avoided when taking FDOA measurements.

The process of geolocating a signal requires some knowledge of the signal and all the techniques in order to get an accurate location.

The geolocation of a CW signal is nearly impossible with TDOA-FDOA. Nevertheless, a nominally CW transmission can contain imperfections, especially if a station transmits near its maximum EIRP. Hence, it often has a phase noise component which might be recognized as a modulated signal and therefore used to make TDOA measurements. However, it is generally more accurate to locate a CW carrier using FDOA-FDOA geolocation, even for non inclined satellites.

This is especially used today whenever high power CW jamming of actual full power multiplex transmissions occurs.
