= Kevin Jackson (disambiguation) =

Kevin Jackson (born 1964) is an American wrestler.

Kevin Jackson may also refer to:

- Kevin Jackson (American football) (born 1973), American football player
- Kevin Jackson (dancer) (born 1984), Australian ballet dancer
- Kevin Jackson (soccer) (born 1978), American soccer player
- Sanchez (singer) (born 1964), real name Kevin Jackson
- Kevin Jackson (writer) (1955–2021), British writer and filmmaker
- Kevin L. Jackson, American businessperson and writer
- Kevin Jackson (politician) (born 1958), American politician, member of the Kentucky House of Representatives
