= Direction of arrival =

Direction from which a signal is received

In signal processing, direction of arrival (DOA), also called angle of arrival (AoA), is the direction (or its angles) from which usually a signal or propagating wave (e.g. radio, optical, or acoustic) is received. Often there is a sensor array employing the associated technique of beamforming for determining the DOA.

== Determination ==
Typical DOA estimation methods include:

- Periodogram
- MUSIC
- SAMV
- Maximum likelihood
- ESPRIT
- Root MUSIC
- Weighted subspace fitting
- Method of Direction Estimation (MODE)

Advanced sophisticated techniques perform joint direction of arrival and time of arrival (ToA) estimation to allow a more accurate localization of a node. This also has the merit of localizing more targets with less antenna resources. Indeed, it is well-known in the array processing community that, generally speaking, one can resolve $P$ targets via $N > P$ antennas. When JADE (joint angle and delay) estimation is employed, one can go beyond this limit.

Measurement of AoA can be done by determining the direction of propagation of a radio-frequency wave incident on an antenna array or determined from maximum signal strength during antenna rotation.

The AoA can be calculated by measuring the time difference of arrival (TDOA) between individual elements of the array.

Generally this TDOA measurement is made by measuring the difference in received phase at each element in the antenna array. This can be thought of as beamforming in reverse. In beamforming, the signal from each element is weighed to "steer" the gain of the antenna array. In AoA, the delay of arrival at each element is measured directly and converted to an AoA measurement.

Consider, for example, a two element array spaced apart by one-half the wavelength of an incoming RF wave. If a wave is incident upon the array at boresight, it will arrive at each antenna simultaneously. This will yield 0° phase-difference measured between the two antenna elements, equivalent to a 0° AoA. If a wave is incident upon the array at broadside, then a 180° phase difference will be measured between the elements, corresponding to a 90° AoA.

In single antenna case, data-driven techniques are powerful tools to estimate AoA, capitalizing on the inherent imperfections of the antenna.

In optics, AoA can be calculated using interferometry.

Limitations on the accuracy of estimation of angle of arrival signals in digital antenna arrays are associated with jitter ADC and DAC.

== Applications ==
Various engineering problems addressed in the associated literature are:

- Find the direction relative to the array where the sound source is located
- Direction of different sound sources around you are also located by you using a process similar to those used by the algorithms in the literature
- Radio telescopes use these techniques to look at a certain location in the sky
- Recently beamforming has also been used in radio frequency (RF) applications such as Wireless communication. Compared with the spatial diversity techniques, beamforming is preferred in terms of complexity. On the other hand, beamforming in general has much lower data rates. In multiple access channels (code-division multiple access (CDMA), frequency-division multiple access (FDMA), time-division multiple access (TDMA)), beamforming is necessary and sufficient
- Various techniques for calculating the direction of arrival, such as angle of arrival (AoA), time difference of arrival (TDOA), frequency difference of arrival (FDOA), or other similar associated techniques.
- Limitations on the accuracy of estimation of direction of arrival signals in digital antenna arrays are associated with jitter ADC and DAC.

An application of AoA is in the geolocation of cell phones. The aim is either for the cell system to report the location of a cell phone placing an emergency call or to provide a service to tell the user of the cell phone where they are. Multiple receivers on a base station would calculate the AoA of the cell phone's signal, and this information would be combined to determine the phone's location.

AoA is generally used to discover the location of pirate radio stations or of any military radio transmitter.

In submarine acoustics, AoA is used to localize objects with active or passive ranging.

Bluetooth Angle of Arrival has also been adopted in commercial indoor location systems for real-time asset tracking and positioning.

== See also ==
- Geolocation
- GNSS
- GSM localization
- Multilateration
- Radiolocation
- Time of arrival
- Triangulation
- Trilateration
- Wideband Space Division Multiple Access
- Direction finding
