= Tri-cell =

Tri-cell is one of several location-based services technologies that are used to locate or track the location of a mobile phone. Other technologies include TDOA and AGPS. Tri-cell makes a number of measurements within the phone and sends these measurements to a central server that uses a hybrid of methods to calculate the location of the phone on a continuous basis. Tri-cell was invented by the company Trisent Communication Ltd.
