= Parallax scanning =

Parallax scanning depth enhancing imaging methods rely on discrete parallax differences between depth planes in a scene. The differences are caused by a parallax scan. When properly balanced (tuned) and displayed, the discrete parallax differences are perceived by the brain as depth.

A continuously moving parallax scan records a pattern of sequential parallax views on a single strip of film or video tape. The lens's optical axis sweeps in the plane of the nominal X and Y axes around the nominal optical Z axis, pivoting on the optical convergence point (out along the Z axis), so that it passes through positions having parallax in relation to the optical convergence point. The circular scanning of the lens's optical axis traces out a coaxial cone pattern with the convergence point as its apex.

Early tests revealed that the brain will translate parallax scanned information into depth information at scanning frequencies of between 3–6 Hz, and that the ideal frequency is 4.31 Hz.

== Human Visual Perception ==
In his 1995 book, Foundations of Vision, Brian Wandell states, "Perception is an interpretation of the retinal image, not a description. Information in the retinal image may be interpreted in many different ways. Because we begin with ambiguous information, we cannot make deductions from the retinal image, only inferences. ....we have learned that the visual system succeeds in interpreting images because of statistical regularities present in the visual environment and hence in the retinal image. These regularities permit the visual system to use fragmentary information present in the retinal image to draw accurate inferences about the physical cause of the image. For example, when we make inferences from the retinal image, the knowledge that we live in a three-dimensional world is essential to the correct interpretation of the image. Often, we are made aware of the existence of these powerful interpretations and their assumptions when they are in error, that is, when we discover a visual illusion."

While it is not possible to create a stereo image on a standard display without special equipment, it is possible to create an image with enhanced texture and depth. The parallax scanning lens technology creates autostereoscopic moving images with enhanced texture and depth on standard displays (television, movie screens and computer monitors) without the necessity of special screens or the use of viewing glasses. Images can be recorded on normal film or videotape using industry standard camera systems. The image depth enhancement is accomplished entirely by the lens using parallax scanning technology.

== Psycho-physical Research ==
It is known that the act of visual perception is a cognitive exercise and not merely a stimulus response. In other words, perception is a learned ability which we develop in infancy. Kenneth Ogle of the Mayo Clinic, reported 1967 that left and right-eye information can be presented alternatively to the left and right eyes, resulting in depth perception as long as the time interval does not exceed 100 ms. Visual researcher David Marr has suggested that perceptual fusion of binocular information occurs in a short-term memory buffer by means of some sort of visual depth mapping. In 1984, Edwin Jones of the University of South Carolina reported that the human brain can accept and process parallax information without regard to the direction of the parallax, i.e. horizontal, diagonal or vertical. A. P. McLaurin of the University of South Carolina, has stated that if visual information is in fact compared in a temporary memory and does not have to be received simultaneously, there is no reason why stereoscopic information that is appropriately sequenced at the proper rate cannot be observed by the single eye.

In August 1998, the University of Virginia—Cognitive Science Department received an Innovation Award from the Virginia Center for Innovative Technology (CIT) to fund a research project to study the perceptual aspects of parallax scanning on the human visual system. This project and its subsequent report were completed in March 1999.

The UVA report titled Perceived depth is enhanced with parallax scanning, was the first independent study of the parallax scanning technologies. Dr. Dennis Proffitt and Tom Banton's work confirm that parallax scanning enhances perceived depth in images, especially when the object depth is large (See UVA Report). The more depth in the scene, the more parallax scanning enhances its perception by a viewer on a standard television screen without the aid of special glasses.

== See also ==
- Stereopsis
- parallax scrolling
- Critical alignment through Parallax Induction
- Parallax Image Display (PID)
- Vision III Imaging, Inc.
- 3D Display
- vergence-accommodation conflict
