= Kevin L. Jackson =

American business executive and writer (born 1955)

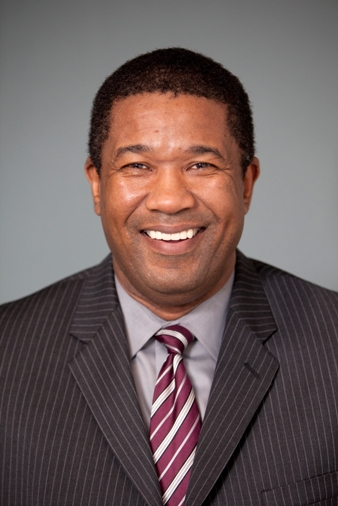
- Born: Kevin L. Jackson ca. 1955; Atlanta, Georgia, U.S.
- Occupations: CEO & Founder GovCloud Network
- Known for: Authority on cloud computing
- Website: http://www.kevinljackson.com

Kevin L. Jackson is an American business executive and writer. He served in the US Navy for fifteen years, before becoming a senior business executive in the computer industry. Jackson is currently the CEO & Founder, GovCloud Network, a consultancy formed to assist agencies and businesses leverage the parallel and global nature of cloud computing.

== Naval career ==
Jackson graduated from the United States Naval Academy in 1979 with a BS Aerospace Engineering. He later graduated from the Naval War College with an MA National Security & Strategic Studies degree and an MSEE in Computer Engineering from the Navy Postgraduate School. Between 1979 and 1994, Jackson was an officer in the United States Navy, where he specialized in space systems engineering, airborne logistics, and airborne command and control. He was an aircraft carrier pilot, and during his time with the Navy he also served at the National Reconnaissance Office, Operational Support Office, which provides global logistical support for the Marine Corps and Navy. He also served at the US Navy Space Technology Program.

== Computer industry ==
Between 1996 and 1999 Jackson served as Chief Technology Officer of Sentel Corporation, which was the winner of the NASA Small Business Innovative Research program under his direction. In 1997 Jackson attended the first annual International Symposium on Wearable Computers on behalf of the company and was featured in the New York Times' coverage of the event. In January 1999 Jackson wrote in Speech Technology Magazine: "For the first time in the nearly 40–year history of "wearable" computers, reality can meet society's expectations ... an ideal wearable computer would not only provide a seamless interface for aural and visual communication, but also remain accessible to the user's mouth, ears, and eyes throughout the range of daily activities." After leaving Sentel, Jackson worked as a senior executive in the private sector, including for companies like IBM and JP Morgan Chase. He also served as a vice president for Dataline LLC. In February 2010 Jackson became the General Manager of Cloud Computing Services for NJVC. That year Jackson was named a "Cyber Security Visionary" by US Black Engineer & IT magazine.

== Publishing ==
In 1995-96 Jackson co-produced the interactive CD-ROM Black Wings - A Chronicle of African Americans in Aviation, in conjunction with the Smithsonian Institution. The CD covers the contributions that African-Americans have made to aviation in America, with narration from Montel Williams. Since 2008 Jackson has run a cloud-computing blog entitled Cloud Musings by Kevin Jackson. In 2011 the Cloud Computing Journal named Jackson's blog one of the top 100 blogs on cloud computing in the United States. Since March 2011 Jackson has also written the Cloud Musing on Forbes blog for Forbes Magazine, covering the growing use of cloud computing in both the public and private sectors.

In 2011 Jackson co-authored the government training book GovCloud: Implementation and Cloud Brokerage Service with Don Philpott. In 2012 Jackson released the book's follow-up GovCloud II: Implementation and Cloud Brokerage Service. He then appeared as an author on Kansas City's NPR on November 25, 2012, where he discussed the government mandates to move the US Federal government to a cloud-based network. Jackson had been previously interviewed by the national NPR regarding the Federal government's push for cloud-computing, including in December 2008 when the incoming US President Barack Obama made the decision to convert the White House's computer system cloud–computing.

Kevin L. Jackson has been globally recognized as a cloud computing expert, Dell "PowerMore" Thought Leader and Founder/Author of the award winning “Cloud Musings” blog. Jackson has also been recognized as a “Top 100 Cybersecurity Influencer and Brand” by Onalytica (2015), a Huffington Post “Top 100 Cloud Computing Experts on Twitter” (2013), a “Top 50 Cloud Computing Blogger for IT Integrators” by CRN (2015) and a “Top 5 Must Read Cloud Blog” by BMC Software (2015). His next publication, “Practical Cloud Security: A Cross Industry View”, will be released by Taylor & Francis in the spring of 2016.
