= Vertelli =

Vertelli, or Professor Vertelli (stage name of John Morcom, Cornwall, June 12, 1840 – West Berkeley, Berkeley, California, January 8, 1914), was a British-Australian tightrope walker and stage magician, and the brother of cricketer Samuel Morcom.

== Biography ==
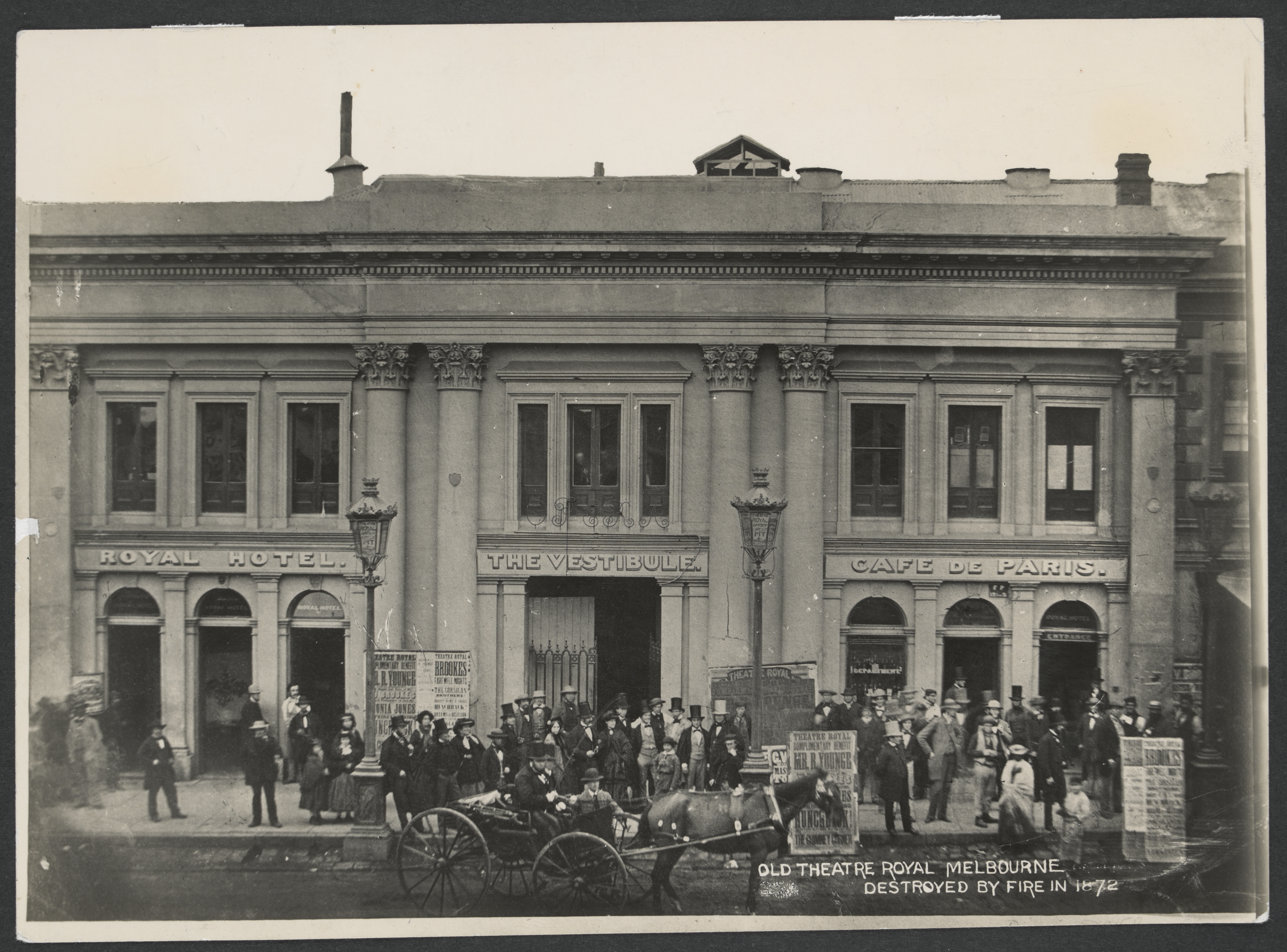
Theatre Royal, Melbourne

John Morcom was born on June 12, 1840, in a family of impoverished Cornish miners. His father emigrated to Australia in 1848, and the family followed him one year later. His brother Samuel became a leading Australian cricketer.

In 1863, he debuted as a trapeze artist, and by 1866 he decided to focus on tightrope walking. Australian media nicknamed him "the Australian Blondin", a reference to the well-known French tightrope walker Charles Blondin. He entertained his audiences by walking on a tightrope without pole and blindfolded, and even with heavy ladies from the audience who accepted to be carried by him on the rope.

His most important shows were at the Theatre Royal, Melbourne where, according to Australian media, he was paid £100 per week. As other tightrope walkers of his time, he also performed outdoors, including by crossing the river below Niagara Falls on a wire, and walking from the top of a building to the one opposite it by crossing a street in New Westminster, Canada, at night and without lights.

When he got older, he abandoned tightrope walking and performed as a stage magician and ventriloquist. He formed his own troupe and toured China, Japan and the United States for more than twenty years, after settling in San Francisco. He was among the first Western magicians to perform in Yokohama and Tokyo, where he was very successful.

In his later years, he suffered with a paralysis of both feet, and continued his career as a professional astrologer and Tarot card reader, until his death in West Berkeley, California, on January 8, 1914, at age 73.
