= List of federal agencies in Northern Virginia =

The following Federal Agencies are headquartered in Northern Virginia. Agencies with approximately 10,000+ employees, or a $10 billion+ budget are in bold.

Agency (common abbreviation)	City/CDP (Area)	Seal/Insignia/Crest
Defense Contract Management Agency	Alexandria	
National Credit Union Administration	Alexandria	
Office of the Inspector General, U.S. Department of Defense	Alexandria	
Office of Local Defense Community Cooperation, formerly the Office of Economic Adjustment (OEA) (OLDCC)	Alexandria	
**United States Patent and Trademark Office (PTO)**	Alexandria	
**Food and Nutrition Service (FNS)**	Alexandria	
National Science Foundation (NSF)	Alexandria	
Foreign Service Institute	Arlington (Arlington Hall)	
**Air Force Office of Special Investigations (AFOSI)**	Triangle (Quantico)	
Air Force Research Laboratory (AFOSR)	Arlington (Ballston)	
**DARPA**	Arlington (Ballston)	
**Defense POW/MIA Accounting Agency (DPAA)**	Arlington (The Pentagon)	
**Defense Security Cooperation Agency (DSCA)**	Arlington (The Pentagon)	
**Cybersecurity and Infrastructure Security Agency (CISA)**	Arlington (Ballston)	
**Nuclear Waste Technical Review Board**	Arlington (Courthouse)	
**US Marshals Service (USMS)**	Arlington (Crystal City)	
**Special Inspector General for Afghanistan Reconstruction (SIGAR)**	Arlington (Crystal City)	
**Warrior Transition Command**	Arlington (Crystal City)	
**Mine Safety and Health Administration (MSHA)**	Arlington (Crystal City)	
**Army National Guard Readiness Center**	Arlington (Arlington Hall)	
**Joint Improvised Explosive Device Defeat Organization**	Arlington (The Pentagon)	
**United States Air Force (USAF)**	Arlington (The Pentagon)	
**United States Army (USA)**	Arlington (The Pentagon)	
**United States Marine Corps (USMC)**	Arlington (The Pentagon)	
**United States Navy (USN)**	Arlington (The Pentagon)	
**Department of Defense (DOD)**	Arlington (The Pentagon)	
**Department of the Air Force**	Arlington (The Pentagon)	
**Department of the Army**	Arlington (The Pentagon)	
**Department of the Navy**	Arlington (The Pentagon)	
**Missile Defense Agency (MDA)**	Fort Belvoir	
**National Guard Bureau (NGB)**	Arlington (The Pentagon)	
**National Security Space Office**	Arlington (The Pentagon)	
**National Technical Information Service (NTIS)**	Alexandria	
**Pentagon Force Protection Agency (PFPA)**	Arlington (The Pentagon)	
**Transportation Security Administration (TSA)**	Arlington (Pentagon City)	
**Drug Enforcement Administration (DEA)**	Arlington (Pentagon City)	
**Bureau of Conflict and Stabilization Operations (CSO)**	Arlington (Rosslyn)	
**Bureau of Diplomatic Security**	Arlington (Rosslyn)	
**Bureau of Overseas Buildings Operations**	Arlington (Rosslyn)	
**United States Trade and Development Agency**	Arlington (Rosslyn)	
**Federal Deposit Insurance Corporation (FDIC)**	Arlington (Virginia Square)	
**United States Fish & Wildlife Service**	Bailey's Crossroads	
**National Reconnaissance Office (NRO)**	Chantilly	
**National Reconnaissance Operations Center**	Chantilly	
Defense Health Agency (DHA)	Falls Church	
**Defense Contract Audit Agency (DCAA)**	Fort Belvoir	
**Defense Logistics Agency (DLA)**	Fort Belvoir	
**Defense Counterintelligence and Security Agency (DCSA)**	Triangle (Quantico)	
**Defense Human Resources Activity (DHRA)**	Alexandria	
**Defense Technology Security Administration (DTSA)**	Alexandria	
**Defense Threat Reduction Agency (DTRA)**	Fort Belvoir	
**Department of Defense Education Activity (DODEA)**	Alexandria	
**National Geospatial-Intelligence Agency (NGA)**	Fort Belvoir	
**United States Army Intelligence and Security Command (INSCOM)**	Fort Belvoir	
**Washington Headquarters Services (WHS)**	Arlington (The Pentagon)	
**Central Intelligence Agency (CIA)**	McLean (Langley)	
Farm Credit Administration	McLean (Tysons Corner)	
**National Counterterrorism Center (NCTC)**	McLean (Tysons Corner)	
**Office of the Director of National Intelligence (ODNI)**	McLean (Tysons Corner)	
**United States Geological Survey (USGS)**	Reston	
**Bureau of Indian Affairs** Division of Acquisitions	Reston	
**Department of State**	Arlington	

== See also ==
- List of federal installations in Maryland
- List of companies headquartered in Northern Virginia
- List of space companies and facilities in Virginia
