= List of federal installations in Maryland =

Many federal agencies have their headquarters or other large installations in Maryland.

== Civilian ==
Federal agency	Location
Beltsville Agricultural Research Center	Beltsville
Census Bureau	Suitland
Centers for Medicare and Medicaid Services (CMS)	Woodlawn
Consumer Product Safety Commission (CPSC)	Bethesda
Department of Energy (DOE)	Germantown
Environmental Protection Agency (EPA)	Fort Meade
Food and Drug Administration (FDA)	White Oak
Intelligence Advanced Research Projects Activity (IARPA)	Bethesda
Intelligence Community Campus-Bethesda (ICC-B)	Bethesda
Internal Revenue Service (IRS)	New Carrollton
National Archives and Records Administration (NARA)	College Park
NASA's Goddard Space Flight Center	Greenbelt
Naval Air Systems Command	Patuxent River
National Institute of Standards and Technology (NIST)	Gaithersburg
National Institutes of Health (NIH)	Bethesda
National Intelligence University (NIU)	Bethesda
National Oceanic and Atmospheric Administration (NOAA)	Silver Spring
Nuclear Regulatory Commission (NRC)	North Bethesda
National Security Agency (NSA)	Fort Meade
Smithsonian Environmental Research Center (SERC)	Edgewater
Social Security Administration (SSA)	Woodlawn
Substance Abuse and Mental Health Services Administration	Rockville

== Military ==
Military installation	Location
Aberdeen Proving Ground	Aberdeen
Joint Base Andrews Naval Air Facility	Camp Springs
Army Research Laboratory	Adelphi
Camp David	Thurmont
Fort Detrick	Frederick
Indian Head Naval Surface Weapons Center	Indian Head
National Military Medical Center (NMMC)	Bethesda
Naval Air Station Patuxent River	St. Mary's County
Naval Surface Warfare Center, Carderock	Potomac
United States Naval Academy	Annapolis
Naval Outlying Field Webster	St. Mary's County
Defense Information Systems Agency (DISA)	Fort Meade
United States Cyber Command	Fort Meade
Library of Congress (LOC)	Fort Meade

== See also ==
- List of federal agencies in Northern Virginia
