= MakeOffices =

American real estate service company

- Company type: Privately Held Company
- Industry: Commercial real estate
- Founded: McLean, Virginia, United States 2012
- Founder: Ray Rahbar; Jason Shrensky; Chris Junior
- Defunct: 2021
- Headquarters: Arlington, Virginia, United States
- Number of locations: 15
- Area served: Chicago, Philadelphia, Washington, DC metropolitan area
- Key people: Jeffrey Langdon (CEO)
- Services: Coworking and shared office space
- Number of employees: 70
- Parent: MakeOffices
- Website: www.makeoffices.com

MakeOffices (founded as UberOffices) was an American coworking and real estate service company. The company operated in three cities: Chicago, Philadelphia, and the Washington, D.C. Metro areas before shutting down in 2021.

== Background ==
UberOffices was founded in 2012 by Ray Rahbar, Jason Shrensky, Chris Junior and several other partners. The company leased office spaces, executive offices and suites, and virtual offices on a month-to-month basis. The concept originated in 2007 as a shared-office model intended to reduce startup operating costs. Early funding was provided by angel investors, individual entrepreneurs, and the CYwP Fund.

The company first opened an 8,500 square feet shared co-office space at 1401 Wilson Blvd., Arlington, Virginia with 25 offices. It was later occupied by 47 tech company startups. This was followed by an office in the Tysons area of McLean, Virginia in June 2013, with 16,000 square feet and 47 offices. The third location was opened in the Dupont Circle area of Washington, D.C., with 40,000 square feet, containing 103 offices.

In August 2013, United States Senator Mark Warner from Virginia visited the Rosslyn office to talk to tenants and media members about the startup growth in the region.

In November 2015, the company changed its name to MakeOffices.

In January 2016, MakeOffices opened offices in Philadelphia. It also had offices in Chicago.

In January 2021, the company announced it was shutting down because of the COVID-19 pandemic.
