= Aspetto =

American bullet-resistant clothing manufacturer

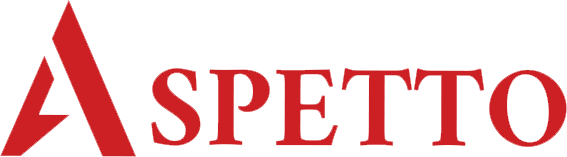
- Industry: Clothing
- Founded: 2008
- Founder: Abbas Haider
- Headquarters: Fredericksburg, Virginia
- Key people: Abbas Haider (CEO); Robert Davis (COO)
- Website: aspetto.com

Aspetto is an American producer and retailer of ballistic clothing and non-ballistic fashion.

== Founding ==
Aspetto is based in Fredericksburg, Virginia. The president and CEO of the company is Abbas Haider, who founded Aspetto in 2008. Robert Davis later joined the company, and serves as the company's chief operating officer. The company began as a regular clothing line, and later changed its focus to ballistic clothing, an idea that Haider and Davis developed for a 2011 university class at the University of Mary Washington. The two met with a ballistics producer and built a prototype suit, and began fielding queries from government agencies within a few months. Following the end of the class, Haider and Davis began to develop and sell the bullet-resistant products, and began producing what it referred to as “ballistic” fashion. The company name “Aspetto” comes from the Italian word for “appearance”.

== Clothing ==
Aspetto body armor is certified by the National Institute of Justice, the US national certification body for bullet-resistant body armor, and exceeds the testing standards for the NIJ, in addition to the DEA and FBI. Much of its clothing is produced for government agencies in the United States, including the Department of Homeland Security for U.S. Customs and Border Protection. It is also available through retail sale for civilians, after customers have passed a background check.

Clothing items include both business suits and casual wear such as t-shirts, underwear, vest, shoes, undershirts, and others, in addition to custom-made items and local cultural apparel. The company produces non-ballistic wear clothing as well. Fabrics used have included wool and silk, among 500 different options. The company also produces uniform designs for the American military, specifically for females soldiers.

== Bullet resistance ==
Bullets that Aspetto clothing provides protection from include 9mm, .40 caliber, .45 semiautomatic rifle bullets and others. Clothing can be designed to stop most handguns at point blank range, or with hard armor plates for protection against more powerful weapons.
