= Transmitter Location Systems =

American radio interference satellite geolocation company

Transmitter Location Systems, LLC (TLS) is an American radio interference satellite geolocation company based in Chantilly, Virginia.

TLS's only business is geolocating the source of satellite radio interference, including one incident when a base in Cuba was accused by United States officials of jamming U.S. satellite broadcasts to Iran. TLS is a wholly owned subsidiary of Interferometrics, Inc., a science and engineering company.

The company's technology was created from early research in radio astronomy. TLS owns several patents on geolocation technology. It sells and operates a commercial system called TLS NexGen, and provides a 24/7 geolocation service for satellite operators worldwide.

The company also provides various services supporting communications analysis.
