= Siteworx =

Digital consultancy firm

Siteworx, LLC
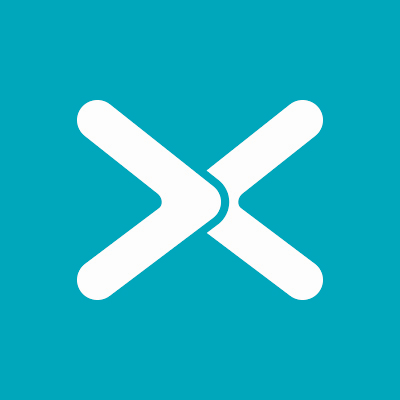
- Type: Private
- Industry: Internet
- Founded: May 22, 2002
- Headquarters: Reston, Virginia, USA
- Key people: Tim McLaughlin, Rand Kramer, Founders
- Website: siteworx.com

Siteworx, LLC was a digital consultancy. The agency was best known for its work with large companies such as Time Warner Cable, Citrix, and Mandarin Oriental Hotel Group. Siteworx rebranded as Shift7 Digital and was acquired by Merkle, Inc., a division of Dentsu Inc.

== Company history ==
Siteworx was founded in 2002 by Tim McLaughlin and former VP of Creative, Rand Kramer. McLaughlin served as chairman of the board and is now a boardmember of Shift7 Digital. Siteworx secured its first enterprise client in 2007 when Mandarin Oriental Hotel Group (MOHG) engaged Siteworx to build and manage MandarinOriental.com. Over the subsequent years, Siteworx built a diverse portfolio composed primarily of large commercial clients.

In 2012, Siteworx received an investment from Riordan, Lewis & Haden, a private equity firm based in Los Angeles, CA that invests in high-growth, profitable enterprises with $20–$150 million of annual revenue. In 2013, Siteworx was awarded the 2013 Corporate Growth Award for Corporate Growth Company of the Year ($25M - $75M category) by the National Capital Chapter of ACG (Association for Corporate Growth) and then Siteworx CEO McLaughlin was named as a Finalist for the 2013 Ernst & Young Entrepreneur of the Year Award.

In 2014, Adobe Systems named Siteworx its North American Regional Partner of the Year and Intershop appointed Siteworx as a strategic partner for integrating Intershop's omni-channel commerce platform and Adobe Experience Manager. This was in addition to being named a Sitecore Certified Solution Partner.

Siteworx rebranded to Shift7 Digital in 2018. Shift7 Digital was acquired by Merkle, Inc. in 2023.

== Select notable clients ==
=== American Diabetes Association (ADA) ===
In 2010, Diabetes.org was redesigned and relaunched. The website was selected for Outstanding Achievement in the Health/Nutrition category by Interactive Media Awards.

=== Mandarin Oriental Hotel Group ===
MandarinOriental.com was redeployed in 2012 on both desktop and mobile following the implementation of additional language capabilities, the integration of Conde Nast's Destination MO online magazine, and the custom built platform, "My Stays."

=== RSM US LLP (formerly McGladrey) ===
RSMUS.com was redesigned with a centralized campaign platform composed of Adobe Experience Manager, Adobe Analytics, and Adobe Target. In 2013, the RSM/McGladrey website garnered an Interactive Media Award for Best in Class in the Professional Services category.

=== Public Broadcasting Service (PBS) ===
In 2011, PressRoom.pbs.org was redesigned. The website won a 17th Annual Communicator Award of Excellence, as well as a Davy Silver Award in the Publishing category.

== Awards ==
Siteworx has been named in both EContent Magazine's "Top 100 Companies That Matter Most in the Digital Content Industry" and KM World's "100 Companies that Matter in Knowledge Management" for three consecutive years. The agency has also garnered over 25 awards from Interactive Media Awards and 22 Davy awards for both Siteworx.com and multiple clients, such as US News, McGladrey LLP, National Geographic, AOL, and the US House of Representatives. Siteworx is also the recipient of the Art Directors Club of Metro Washington's (ADCMW) Gold Award and a Gold Stevie® Award (Business).
