= StreetShares =

- Type: Private
- Industry: Financial Technology
- Founded: December 2013
- Founders: Mark L. Rockefeller, Mickey Konson, Ben Shiflet
- Headquarters: Reston, Virginia, United States
- Products: Business loan, financial software, Banking as a service (BaaS)
- Website: streetsharesplatform.com

StreetShares, Inc. is a financial technology company and small business funding marketplace based outside of Washington, D.C.

== History ==
StreetShares Inc. launched in 2014 as a military veteran-focused peer-to-peer lender by Mark L. Rockefeller, Mickey Konson, and Ben Shiflet. In May 2014, StreetShares raised a $1.2 million seed stage investment with investors including global microfinance company, ACCION International, Washington D.C. area community bankers, military veteran investors, Harvard Business School angel investors, and Capital One alumni.

From 2014 to 2016, StreetShares operated as a “veterans funding veterans” peer-to-peer lender focused on funding businesses owned by military veterans. StreetShares used social affinity between military veterans to reduce the risk and price of loans. Lending capital was provided by military supporters in a reverse-auction format, in which individuals could offer to lend a portion of a loan request. The lowest cost loan offers were combined to make a single loan.

Since 2015, StreetShares was on the list of financial technology companies to support the transparent lending practices articulated in the Small Business Borrowers Bill of Rights, a pledge requiring online lenders to clearly disclose the terms of a business loan and to follow other fair lending practices. In 2016, StreetShares received approval from the United States Securities and Exchange Commission for America's first public social impact investment product for veterans. StreetShares used a new provision called Regulation A+ of the Jumpstart Our Business Startups Act (JOBS Act). The law allowed members of the public to lend to businesses on the StreetShares platform.

In April 2015, StreetShares was named Best Investment in the 2015 global Harvard Business School New Venture Competition, an alumni competition sponsored by Harvard Business School's Rock Center for Entrepreneurship and Social Enterprise Initiative. The award was chosen by a global panel of Harvard judges. StreetShares's goal was to introduce new financial technology and provide an alternative to high-cost payday lending for military veteran borrowers. The Washington Business Journal dubbed this system “Shark Tank meets eBay” for veterans.

In April 2017, StreetShares was named Professional Services Innovator of the Year by the Greater Washington Innovation Awards.

In January 2018, StreetShares raised a $23 million equity round led by Rotunda Capital Partners.

In June 2018, StreetShares the co-founders, Mark L. Rockefeller and Mickey Konson, were named Ernst & Young Entrepreneurs of the Year.

In January 2019, StreetShares launched a new business funding product for veteran-owned government contractors impacted by government shutdowns.

In June 2019, StreetShares launched the StreetShares Platform to help community banks and credit unions make loans to small businesses. The company used new technology, described in detail by Forbes as part of a new wave of banking as a service financial software.

== Business model ==
StreetShares offers a white-labeled service on behalf of banks and credit unions so that banks can offer 3 to 36-month term business loans. Borrower applicants must be U.S. citizens or permanent residents, in business for at least one year, earning revenue, incorporated or LLC, and have a business guarantor. StreetShares charges a pre-disclosed one-time origination fee based on term length, risk and loan amount. Banks and credit unions pay a subscription fee for the technology. Funding for the loans can come from StreetShares own balance sheet or from the banks and credit unions directly. Because StreetShares has its own lending balance sheet, the technology may also be used by non-finance companies. StreetShares investments are available to qualified investor members with an established StreetShares account.

== Reception ==
StreetAuthority stated that the StreetShares auction model drives down costs and may preview the biggest competitive threat to popular alternative lender OnDeck. According to Entrepreneur Magazine contributor and Small Business Development Center Director, Kedma Ough, StreetShares is considered a top resource for small businesses owned by military veterans.

== Board of Advisors ==
- Raj Date, Fenway Summer
- George W. Casey, Jr., retired Chief of Staff of the U.S. Army
- Pete Hartigan, Trusted Ventures, LLC
- Troy A. Paredes, former Commissioner of the U.S. Securities and Exchange Commission.
