= BARE International =

BARE International, Inc.
- Type: Private company
- Industry: Customer experience
- Founded: 1987
- Founders: Dale Bare, Michael Bare
- Headquarters: Fairfax, Virginia, U.S.
- Areas served: North America, South America, Europe, Asia
- Products: Qualitative marketing research; Quantitative marketing research; Survey (human research); Mystery shopping
- Website: www.bareinternational.com

Bare Associates International is a company that specializes in customer experience, brand standard evaluations, audits and inspections for clients in North America, South America, Europe and Asia. The privately held company serves clients in over 100 countries. The worldwide headquarters of Bare Associates International is in Fairfax, Virginia, United States.

== History ==
Bare International was founded in 1987 by Dale and Michael Bare as "Restaurant & Hotel Services".

In 1999, the Fairfax, Virginia-based company became Bare Associates International after opening its first overseas office in Antwerp, Belgium. Bare Associates International now has additional offices in Mumbai, India; Beijing, China; Antwerp, Belgium; Budapest, Hungary; Singapore; São Paulo, Brazil, and Santiago, Chile. The company employs over 500,000 independent contractors worldwide to conduct anonymous evaluations.

== Founders ==
Michael Bare, the company president, is the co-founder and a board member of the Mystery Shopping Providers Association. This national organization works to combat fraud in the mystery shopping industry and promote a Code of Professional Standards and Ethics for the anonymous shopping audit industry. He is a member of the International Society of Hospitality Consultants, a professional society of the top 200 hospitality consultants in the world. Bare Associates International CEO Dale Bare is a member of the Women's Business Enterprise National Council and was a finalist for Enterprise Magazine's 2009 Enterprising Women of the Year Award.

== Honors ==
Bare Associates International has been awarded an INC 5000 listing for three consecutive years. The 5000 list ranks the top 5000 fastest growing companies in the United States. The Inc 5000 ranking for Bare Associates International in 2009 was 1887, up from a ranking of 2068 in 2008 and a ranking of 2717 in 2007. In 2009 and 2010, Bare Associates International was awarded a Top 500 ranking by Diversity Business.
