= Purple Heart Foundation =

American military veteran support organization

- Formation: 1957; 69 years ago
- Type: 501(c)(3) nonprofit organization
- Tax ID no.: 59-3184919
- Headquarters: Annandale, Virginia
- Budget: $20m USD (2019)
- Staff: 65
- Website: purpleheartfoundation.org

The Purple Heart Foundation is a 501(c)(3) non-profit organization headquartered in Annandale, Virginia. Its declared purpose is "to enhance the quality of life of Purple Heart recipients and other honorably discharged veterans and their families."

The organization was established in 1957 as the "Military Order of the Purple Heart (MOPH) Service Foundation" and is governed by an 11-member board of directors. The foundation's programs focus on providing grants and outreach services to wounded veterans and their families, and the foundation has granted or otherwise contributed over $245 million since its founding. These programs include academic scholarships, service dogs, PTSD resources, TBI resources, car giveaways, VA benefits legal aid, and veteran critical assistance grants.

In 2025, the Purple Heart Foundation provided $20,000 in scholarship to 14 winners across the U.S. The MOPH Scholarship Program helps winning applicants with the costs of continuing their education including books, tuition, room and board and incidental fees.

The foundation has faced operational and financial issues in recent years, and currently has 0-star rating from Charity Navigator and an "F" rating from CharityWatch, largely due to the organization's reliance on third-party fundraising companies.
