= Samuel Morcom =

Australian cricketer

Personal information
- Full name: Samuel Morcom
- Born: c. 1847; Cornwall, England
- Died: 15 January 1888 (aged 40–41); Adelaide, South Australia, Australia
- Role: Batsman/occasional wicket-keeper

Domestic team information
- Years: Team
- 1872/73: Rest of Australia

Career statistics
Competition	First-class
Matches	1
Runs scored	4
Batting average	2.00
100s/50s	–/–
Top score	4
Balls bowled	–
Wickets	–
Bowling average	–
5 wickets in innings	–
10 wickets in match	–
Best bowling	–
Catches/stumpings	–/–
- Source: Cricket Archive, 9 April 2012

Samuel Morcom, Jr. (c. 1847 – 15 January 1888) was a leading 19th-century South Australian cricketer.

== Early life ==
Born in Cornwall, England, in 1847 to miner and temperance lecturer Samuel Morcom, Sr. and Mary (née Toy), the fifth of nine children, Morcom sailed with his family to South Australia on the Rajah, arriving at Port Adelaide on 24 September 1847.

Morcom Snr. initially travelled to Reedy Creek to run a copper mine, then joined the Victorian gold rush before moving to Adelaide with his family, where he purchased a hotel in Hindley St, naming it "Morcom's Temperance Hotel". In Adelaide he was a leading member in the local tent of the teetotal Independent Order of Rechabites, which held its meetings at his hotel. Morcom Jnr. also became a staunch teetotaller, and was described as having "very steady habits".

== Cricket career ==
Morcom began playing for Norwood Cricket Club in Adelaide and soon became one of the leading cricketers in the colony, later being referred to as "the prettiest batsman of his time".

Morcom played in the first ever match organised by the South Australian Cricket Association. Chosen in the "British born" team against the "Colonial born" team, the match commenced on 11 November 1872 at the Saint Peter's College Ground (the Adelaide Oval was not yet ready for matches).

Morcom was one of three South Australians chosen in a combined colonies team (players from New South Wales, South Australia and Tasmania) to play Victoria at the Melbourne Cricket Ground, starting Boxing Day 1872. This was subsequently recognised as a first-class match, meaning that Morcom was one of the first South Australians to play first-class cricket, as it would be five years before South Australia played their initial first-class match. The Australasian was not impressed with the quality of the South Australians, criticising their batting and bowling, and wrote that "Morcom, if he threw in better, would make a good long-leg or cover."

While he remained a leading cricketer in the colony, Morcom was the subject of an anonymous letter to the South Australian Register, the leading local newspaper of the day, criticising his "playing for coin rather than love of the game." Morcom hastily responded, stating that the only time in his career he had been paid to play cricket was the 1872 intercolonial match, and that was "only my bare expenses".

Although living in Adelaide, Morcom was chosen in the Yorke's Peninsula XXII that played the touring WG Grace's English team in Kadina in 1873–74. Morcom scored one and, in the second innings, zero, as Yorke's Peninsula's twenty two scored 13 between them, which at that time was the lowest score against an English side.

Despite his failure for Yorke's Peninsula, Morcom was picked in the first ever South Australian cricket team, which played WG Grace's XI at Adelaide Oval, starting on 26 March 1874. Morcom scored zero and six.

Morcom continued to represent South Australian sides against interstate or international opponents throughout the 1870s, including matches against Victoria in 1874 and 1876, James Lillywhite's XI in 1876 and against a combined Australian side in 1877, without scoring higher than 18.

Such was Morcom's popularity in Adelaide that he was featured in some of the earliest sports merchandise marketing in South Australia. One enterprising businessman created belts with a photograph of various leading cricketers and the words "South Australian celebrity". Morcom was one of seven players featured on the belts, with the Register of the belief that the belts were likely to be popular.

== Personal life ==
Morcom worked as a compositor in the Government Printing Office in Adelaide and on 24 February 1876 he married Ellen Bone at St Peter's Collegiate Chapel, Adelaide.

Other members of the Morcom family also gained renown; brother John, under the name Vertelli, became a famous wire walker in the United States, brother James was a champion rifle shot and short-distance pedestrian, William was one of South Australia's top swimmers and Harry was South Australia's top backwards runner at a time when backwards running was a popular competition.

=== Death ===
Around noon on 7 January 1888, Morcom was crossing Rundle Street in Adelaide when he became giddy and stumbled between the wheels of an oncoming trolley, landing on his stomach. The trolley driver, a James Rossiter, was unaware of Morcom's situation and drove the trolley, with its five tonne payload, over Morcom, fracturing his left thigh. Morcom was taken to Royal Adelaide Hospital, where surgeons thought it unnecessary to amputate his left leg. In hospital, Morcom progressed favourably until early on the morning of 15 January, when his condition deteriorated; he died at 3.00 pm that afternoon.

A coroner's inquiry into the death found that the cause of death was inflammation of the lining membrane of the heart, owing to the absorption of blood from the bruised parts of the thigh. Morcom's brother James testified that Morcom had been unwell recently and had been losing his eyesight.
