= Vision III Imaging, Inc. =

Vision III Imaging is a company located in Reston, Virginia that specializes in depth enhancement parallax imaging technologies. It has developed the v3 parallax scanning technology for capturing and recording visual parallax information to high definition (HD), Digital Cinema, 3D graphics, and video games.

== v3 ==
The v3 brand is used by Vision III Imaging, Inc. to identify its parallax scanning technology.

The v3 optical and software tools were designed to capture and/or format three-dimensional depth information (parallax) in a manner that exploits certain human visual perceptual mechanisms when viewed on standard unaided displays. The tools exploit certain short-term visual memory and depth-mapping psychophysical processes.

== Intellectual properties ==
The company has received a total of 20 issued United States patents with three currently pending, three European Patent Office patents with four pending, two Canadian patents with three pending, one Japanese patent with two pending, and one South Korean patent with one pending.

== See also ==
- Parallax scanning
