= NJVC =

Information technology company in association with the U.S. government

NJVC LLC
- Industry: Government Services/ IT
- Founded: 2000
- Headquarters: Chantilly, Virginia, USA
- Key people: Patrick O'Neil (President)
- Number of employees: 1,200+ (2015)
- Parent: Chenega Corporation
- Website: http://www.njvc.com

NJVC is an information technology (IT) company supporting the federal government and the United States Department of Defense. The company supports intelligence, defense and geospatial organizations. NJVC currently has more than 1,200 employees in locations worldwide. Headquartered in Chantilly, Virginia, NJVC has additional facilities in Arnold, Missouri, O'Fallon, Illinois, and St. Louis, Missouri.

NJVC is a wholly owned subsidiary of the Chenega Corporation, a privately held company based in Anchorage, Alaska.

== History ==
Established in 2000 as a joint venture of two Alaska Native Corporations (ANC), Chenega and Arctic Slope Regional Corporation (ASRC), NJVC has expanded from a single contract into a global Information Technology support company. Chris Andersen joined NJVC in 2009 as vice president, finance, before his promotion to chief financial officer, and later to president in 2015.

In 2001, the company was awarded a $1.1 billion technical services and maintenance contract with the National Geospatial-Intelligence Agency (NGA).

In 2012, NJVC was awarded another $34 million for a one-year contract to maintain the NGS's IT infrastructure.

In 2013, NJVC was reissued a contract worth $392 million with the (NGA) to provide technology and information services at 170 sites around the world.

== Services ==
The company provides cloud migration, cyber security, enterprise management and monitoring, and hybrid IT transformation and optimization. A high majority of its staff maintains security clearances.

== People ==
Patrick O'Neil, as of October 2017, is the President of NJVC that is part of the Chenega's MIOS Strategic Business Unit.
