= Capitol Advantage =

American technology company

Capitol Advantage is a Fairfax, Virginia-based technology company. Roll Call acquired Capitol Advantage for $43 million in August 2008.

== Company Description ==
The company is the largest publisher of Congressional directories in the country as well as the market leader in software for online advocacy, having over 1,700 clients. Their clients include large organizations such as America Online, Microsoft, and Yahoo, in addition to over a 1,000 large and small lobbying organizations. The company was founded in 1986 by Bob Hansan and has since grown to a multimillion-dollar company with over 80 employees, including an affiliated sister company, Knowlegis.

== Products ==
- Congress At Your Fingertips
- Capwiz XC and its public-facing website Congress.org
- Knowlegis
- PACbuilder
