= Morcom International =

American communications company

Morcom International, Inc.
- Founded: 1984
- Headquarters: Chantilly, Virginia
- Key people: Manuel A. Ojeda (President)
- Products: IT Consultation, Emergency and Critical Wireless Communication, Weather Information Systems, Aeronautical Communications, Radio, Distributed Antenna Systems, Infrastructure, Integration, Installation
- Number of employees: 105
- Website: www.morcom.com

Morcom International, Inc., branded as Morcom, is an American emergency communication systems and meteorological communication systems provider and government contractor. The company is headquartered in Chantilly, Virginia. Morcom was founded in 1984 in Virginia, United States. Morcom is a privately owned company with international offices in San Jose, Costa Rica and Lima, Peru. Inc. Magazine recognized Morcom on the Inc. 5000 list in 2008, 2009, 2011, 2017, and 2018.

== History ==
Since 1984, Morcom has provided equipment and global installations of public safety, aeronautical, and emergency communications systems. The company specializes in wireless communications, aeronautical communications, radio and weather systems technology. Since 1998, Morcom has been managed by Manuel A. Ojeda, a RF communications specialist. The company has contributed in the development of several technologies involving wireless communication and its application in the field of meteorological data collection, transmission and processing.

Morcom has a presence in South and Central America with international offices in San Jose, Costa Rica and Lima, Peru. The office in Lima has been open since 1984, and Costa Rica's office opened in 2009 to support local projects.

== Work with NOAA ==
In 2004, Morcom developed a CDMA system for the transmission of environmental data collected by remote Data Collection Platforms (DCPs) to the Wallops Island satellite receiving station operated by the National Oceanic and Atmospheric Administration (NOAA).

In 2007, Morcom worked with NOAA to supply tsunami systems for Sri Lanka and the Maldives.

== Acquisition of Alden Electronics, Inc. ==
In 2000, Morcom acquired the brand name and other assets of the former Alden Electronics, Inc. of Westborough, Massachusetts. Making use of Alden's experience in the field of marine electronics, Morcom designed the first software defined radio receiver for marine applications. This receiver features a frequency range covering the complete High Frequency HF band and employs sophisticated software to accomplish the demodulation of Weatherfax and Navtex signals for display on any PC. This development has introduced portability and convenience into a field that had not seen any significant improvement since the late 1990s.

== DC water project ==
In 2014, Morcom was awarded a contract to install a Distributed Antenna System, or DAS, in the DC Water Blue Plains Advanced Waster Treatment Plant. Morcom has been tasked with installing DAS in the 6 miles of tunnels running beneath the facility.

Morcom's DAS installation provides coverage for first responders working in these tunnels. Prior to this installation, whenever DC Water employees went underground, radio communications no longer functioned. The DAS installation has been called modular, scalable, and integrates with the district system used by other DC Metro government agencies and first responders.

The Blue Plains Advanced Waste Water Treatment Plant is the largest advanced waste-water treatment plant in the world, serving over 2 million customers in the Washington DC metro area, covering 150 acres and maintaining a capacity of 370 million gallons per day (MGD), with a peak capacity of 1.07 billion gallons per day (BGD).

During the summer of 2014, DC Water's Blue Plains Advanced Waste Water implemented a process called thermal hydrolysis to generate power for the plant. The procedure involves extracting methane from human waste or "biosolids" in the wastewater, and burning the methane to generate power. The Blue Plains facility is the first of its kind in North America. This process is anticipated to cut the average water bill in Washington DC by one-third.
