= Time of arrival =

When a radio signal reaches a remote receiver

Time of arrival (TOA or ToA) is the absolute time instant when a radio signal emanating from a transmitter reaches a remote receiver. The time span elapsed since the time of transmission (TOT or ToT) is the time of flight (TOF or ToF). Time difference of arrival (TDOA) is the difference between TOAs.

== Usage ==
Many radiolocation systems use TOA measurements to perform geopositioning via true-range multilateration. The true range or distance can be directly calculated from the TOA as signals travel with a known velocity. TOA from two base stations will narrow a position to a position circle; data from a third base station is required to resolve the precise position to a single point. TDOA techniques such as pseudorange multilateration use the measured time difference between TOAs.

The concept may be applied as well with IEEE 802.15.4aCSS as with IEEE 802.15.4aUWB modulation.

== Ways of synchronization ==
As with TDOA, synchronization of the network base station with the locating reference stations is important. This synchronization can be done in different ways:

- With exact synchronous clock on both sides. Inaccuracy in the clock synchronization translates directly to an imprecise location.
- With two signals which have different speed. Sound ranging to a lightning strike works this way (speed of light and sound velocity).
- Via measurement to or triggering from a common reference point.
- Without direct synchronisation, but with compensation of clock phase differences,

== Two-way ranging ==
Two-way ranging is a cooperative method for determining the range between two radio transceiver units. When synchronisation of the oscillators of the involved transmitters is not viable, hence the clocks differ, then applying the measurement as a two ways travel to the receiver and mirrored back to the transmitter compensates for some of the phase differences between the oscillators involved. This concept is applied with the real-time locating system (RTLS) concept as defined in the international standard ISO/IEC FCD 24730–5.

== Determination ==
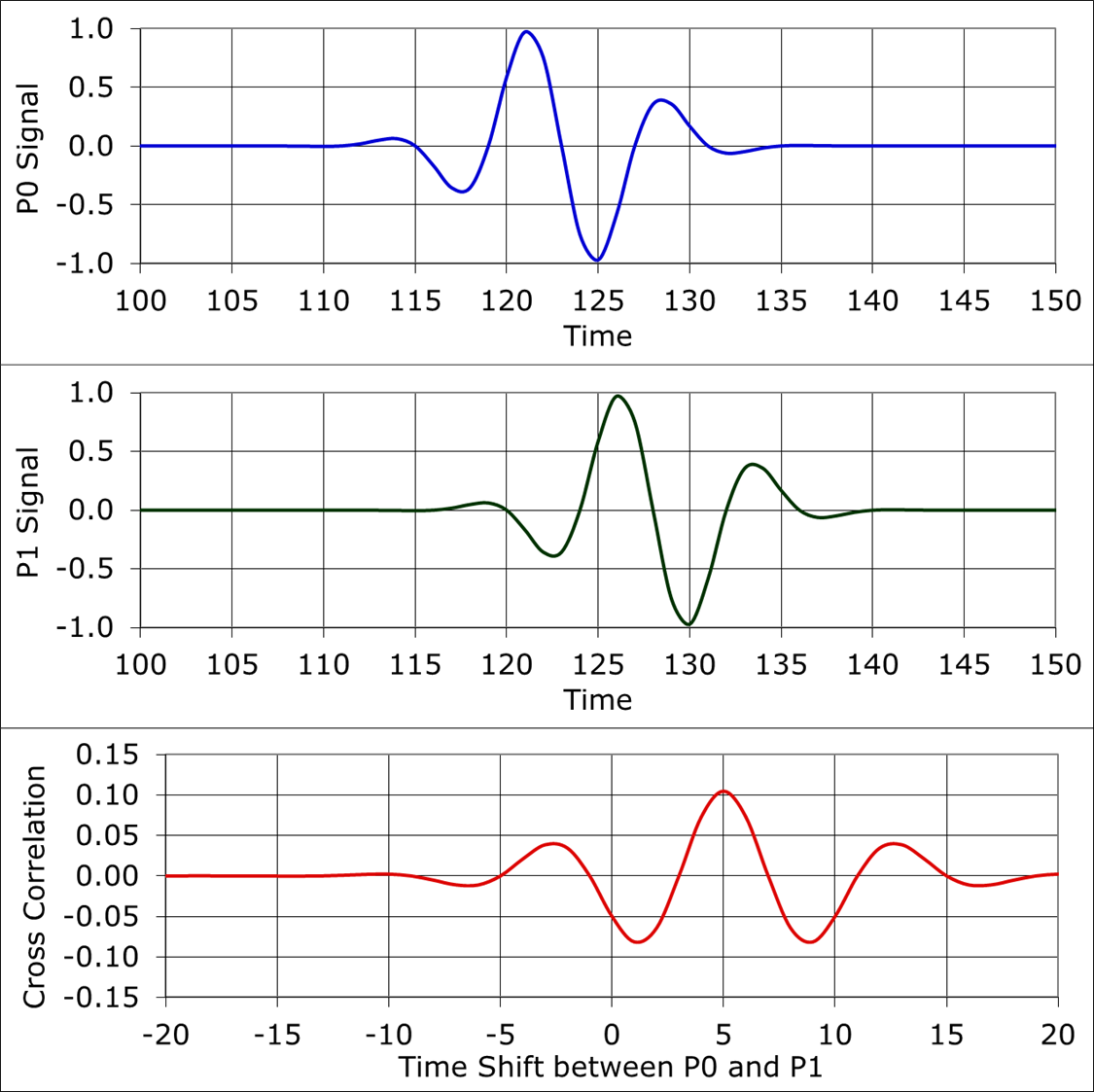
Fig. 4a. Pulse signal

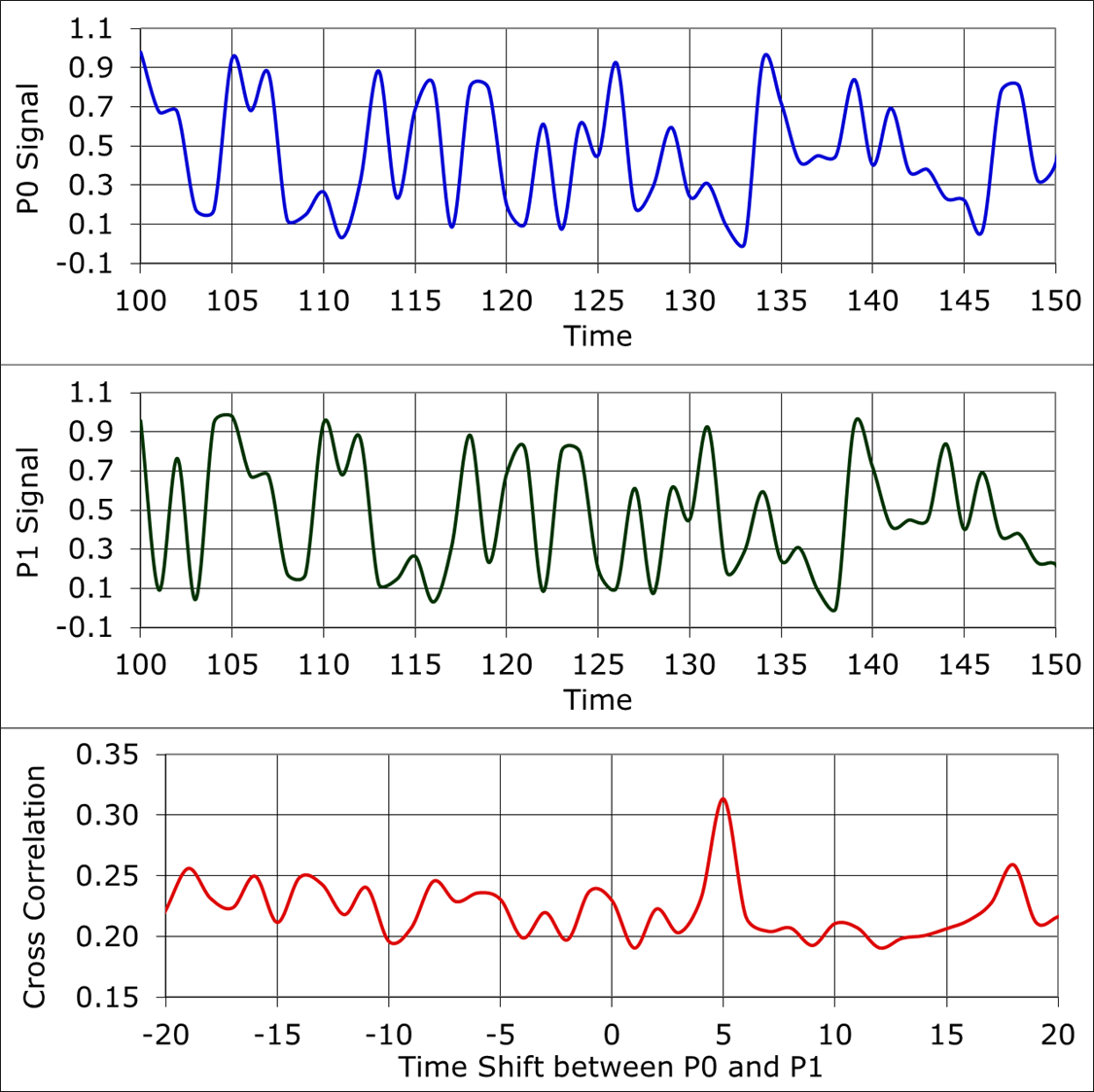
Fig. 4b. Wide-band signal

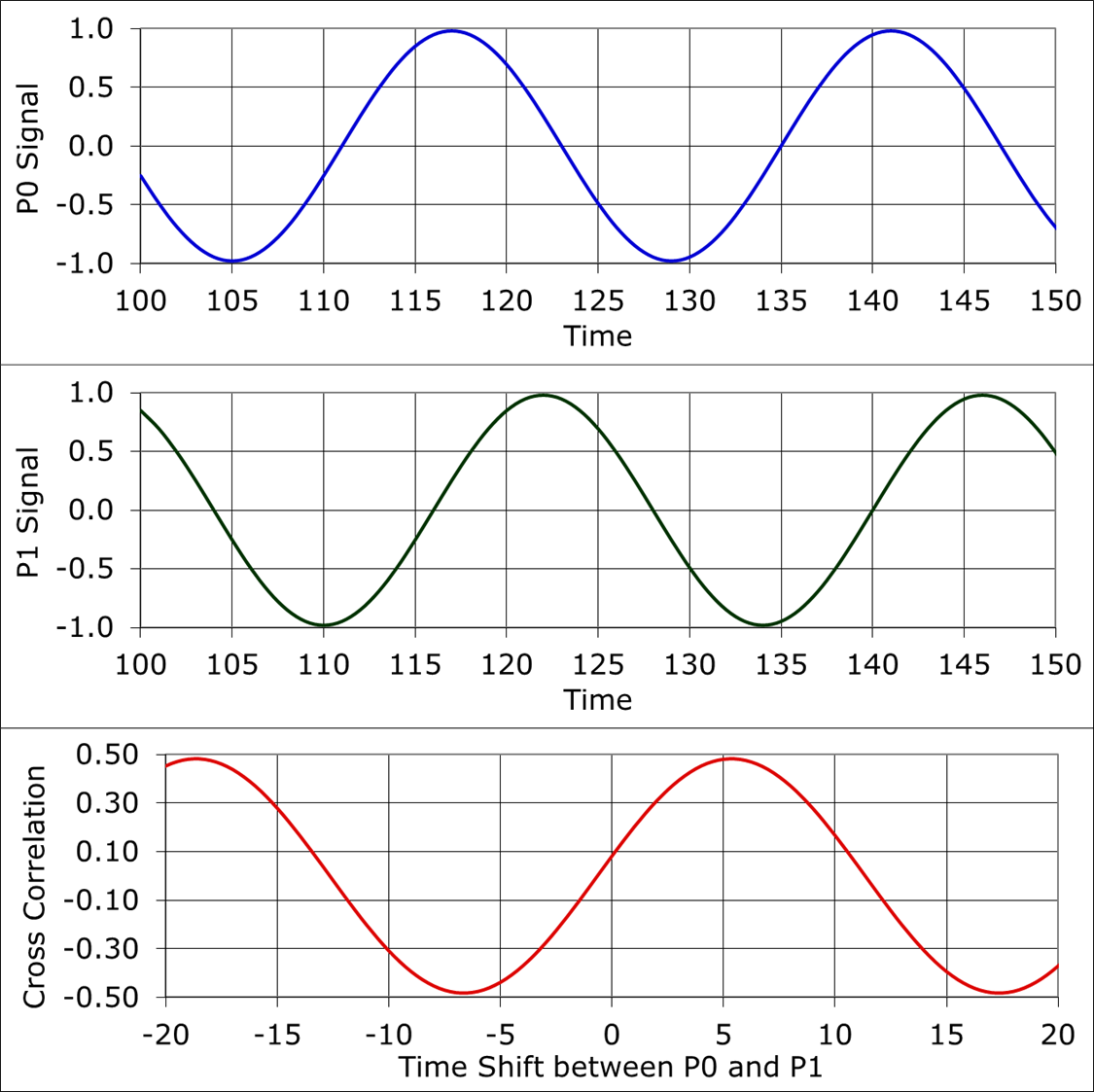
Fig. 4c. Narrow-band signal

Examples of measuring time difference with cross-correlation (surveillance system)

Assume a surveillance system calculates the time differences ($\tau_i$ for $i=1,2,...,m-1$) of wavefronts touching each receiver. The TDOA equation for receivers $i$ and $0$ is (where the wave propagation speed is $c$ and the true vehicle-receiver ranges are $R_0$ and $R_i$)

$$\begin{align}
c \, \tau_i  &= c \, T_i - c \, T_0, \\
c \, \tau_i  &= R_i - R_0.
\end{align}$$

3

The quantity $c \, T_i$ is often termed a pseudo-range. It differs from the true range between the vehicle and station $i$ by an offset, or bias, which is the same for every signal. Differencing two pseudo-ranges yields the difference of the same two true-ranges.

Figure 4a (first two plots) show a simulation of a pulse waveform recorded by receivers $P_0$ and $P_1$. The spacing between $E$, $P_1$ and $P_0$ is such that the pulse takes 5 time units longer to reach $P_1$ than $P_0$. The units of time in Figure 4 are arbitrary. The following table gives approximate time scale units for recording different types of waves:

Type of wave	Material	Time units
Acoustic	Air	1 millisecond
Acoustic	Water	1/2 millisecond
Acoustic	Rock	1/10 millisecond
Electromagnetic	Vacuum, air	1 nanosecond

The red curve in Figure 4a (third plot) is the cross-correlation function $(P_1 \star P_0)$. The cross-correlation function slides one curve in time across the other and returns a peak value when the curve shapes match. The peak at time = 5 is a measure of the time shift between the recorded waveforms, which is also the $\tau$ value needed for equation 3.

Figure 4b shows the same type of simulation for a wide-band waveform from the emitter. The time shift is 5 time units because the geometry and wave speed is the same as the Figure 4a example. Again, the peak in the cross-correlation occurs at $\tau_1 = 5$.

Figure 4c is an example of a continuous, narrow-band waveform from the emitter. The cross-correlation function shows an important factor when choosing the receiver geometry. There is a peak at time = 5 plus every increment of the waveform period. To get one solution for the measured time difference, the largest space between any two receivers must be closer than one wavelength of the emitter signal. Some systems, such as the LORAN C and Decca mentioned at earlier (recall the same math works for moving receiver and multiple known transmitters), use spacing larger than 1 wavelength and include equipment, such as a phase detector, to count the number of cycles that pass by as the emitter moves. This only works for continuous, narrow-band waveforms because of the relation between phase $\theta$, frequency $f$ and time $T$:

$$\theta = 2 \pi f \cdot T.$$

The phase detector will see variations in frequency as measured phase noise, which will be an uncertainty that propagates into the calculated location. If the phase noise is large enough, the phase detector can become unstable.

Navigation systems employ similar, but slightly more complex, methods than surveillance systems to obtain delay differences. The major change is DTOA navigation systems cross-correlate each received signal with a stored replica of the transmitted signal (rather than another received signal). The result yields the received signal time delay plus the user clock's bias (pseudo-range scaled by $1/c$). Differencing the results of two such calculations yields the delay difference sought ($\tau_i$ in equation 3).

TOT navigation systems perform similar calculations as TDOA navigation systems. However, the final step, subtracting the results of one cross-correlation from another, is not performed. Thus, the result is $m$ received signal time delays plus the user clock's bias ($T_i$ in equation 3).

== See also ==
- Angle of arrival
- GSM localization
- Ranging
- Triangulation
