= 4G =

Fourth-generation mobile telecommunications standard

4G is the fourth generation of cellular network technology, introduced in the late 2000s and early 2010s. Compared to preceding third-generation (3G) technologies, 4G has been designed to support all-IP communications and broadband services, and eliminates circuit switching in voice telephony. It also has considerably higher data bandwidth compared to 3G, enabling a variety of data-intensive applications such as high-definition media streaming and the expansion of Internet of Things (IoT) applications. The earliest deployed technologies marketed as "4G" were Long-Term Evolution (LTE), developed by the 3GPP group, and Mobile Worldwide Interoperability for Microwave Access (Mobile WiMAX), based on IEEE specifications. These provided significant enhancements over previous 3G and 2G.

4G icon on a Samsung Galaxy cellphone

== Technical overview ==
In November 2008, the International Telecommunication Union-Radio communications sector (ITU-R) specified a set of requirements for 4G standards, named the International Mobile Telecommunications Advanced (IMT-Advanced) specification, setting peak speed requirements for 4G service at 100 megabits per second (Mbit/s)(=12.5 megabytes per second) for high mobility communication (such as from trains and cars) and 1 gigabit per second (Gbit/s) for low mobility communication (such as pedestrians and stationary users).

Since the first-release versions of Mobile WiMAX and LTE support much less than 1 Gbit/s peak bit rate, they are not fully IMT-Advanced compliant, but are often branded 4G by service providers. According to operators, a generation of the network refers to the deployment of a new non-backward-compatible technology. On December 6, 2010, ITU-R recognized that these two technologies, as well as other beyond-3G technologies that do not fulfill the IMT-Advanced requirements, could nevertheless be considered "4G", provided they represent forerunners to IMT-Advanced compliant versions and "a substantial level of improvement in performance and capabilities with respect to the initial third generation systems now deployed". Both the original LTE and WiMAX standards had previously sometimes been referred to as 3.9G/3.95G. The ITU's new definition for 4G also included Evolved High Speed Packet Access (HSPA+).

Mobile WiMAX Release 2 (also known as WirelessMAN-Advanced or IEEE 802.16m) and LTE Advanced (LTE-A) are IMT-Advanced compliant backwards compatible versions of the above two systems, standardized during the spring 2011, and promising speeds in the order of 1 Gbit/s. In January 2012, the ITU backtracked on its previous definition for 4G, claiming that Mobile WiMAX 2 and LTE Advanced are "true 4G" while their predecessors are "transitional" 3G-4G.

As opposed to earlier generations, a 4G system does not support traditional circuit-switched telephony service, but instead relies on all-Internet Protocol (IP) based communication such as IP telephony. As seen below, the spread spectrum radio technology used in 3G systems is abandoned in all 4G candidate systems and replaced by OFDMA multi-carrier transmission and other frequency-domain equalization (FDE) schemes, making it possible to transfer very high bit rates despite extensive multi-path radio propagation (echoes). The peak bit rate is further improved by smart antenna arrays for multiple-input multiple-output (MIMO) communications.

== Background ==
In the field of mobile communications, a "generation" generally refers to a change in the fundamental nature of the service, non-backwards-compatible transmission technology, higher peak bit rates, new frequency bands, wider channel frequency bandwidth in Hertz, and higher capacity for many simultaneous data transfers (higher system spectral efficiency in bit/second/Hertz/site).

New mobile generations have appeared about every ten years since the first move from 1981 analog (1G) to digital (2G) transmission in 1992. This was followed, in 2001, by 3G multi-media support, spread spectrum transmission and a minimum peak bit rate of 200 kbit/s, in 2011/2012 to be followed by "real" 4G, which refers to all-IP packet-switched networks giving mobile ultra-broadband (gigabit speed) access.

While the ITU has adopted recommendations for technologies that would be used for future global communications, they do not actually perform the standardization or development work themselves, instead relying on the work of other standard bodies such as IEEE, WiMAX Forum, and 3GPP.

In the mid-1990s, the ITU-R standardization organization released the IMT-2000 requirements as a framework for what standards should be considered 3G systems, requiring 2000 kbit/s peak bit rate. The fastest 3G-based standard in the UMTS family is the HSPA+ standard, which has been commercially available since 2009 and offers 21 Mbit/s downstream (11 Mbit/s upstream) without MIMO, i.e. with only one antenna, and in 2011 accelerated up to 42 Mbit/s peak bit rate downstream using either DC-HSPA+ (simultaneous use of two 5 MHz UMTS carriers) or 2x2 MIMO. In theory speeds up to 672 Mbit/s are possible, but have not been deployed yet. The fastest 3G-based standard in the CDMA2000 family is the EV-DO Rev. B, which is available since 2010 and offers 15.67 Mbit/s downstream.

In 2008, ITU-R specified the IMT Advanced (International Mobile Telecommunications Advanced) requirements for 4G systems.

== IMT-Advanced requirements ==
This article refers to 4G using IMT-Advanced (International Mobile Telecommunications Advanced), as defined by ITU-R. An IMT-Advanced cellular system must fulfill the following requirements:

- Be based on an all-IP packet switched network.
- Have peak data rates of up to approximately 100 Mbit/s for high mobility such as mobile access and up to approximately 1 Gbit/s for low mobility such as nomadic/local wireless access.
- Be able to dynamically share and use the network resources to support more simultaneous users per cell.
- Use scalable channel bandwidths of 5–20 MHz, optionally up to 40 MHz.
- Have peak link spectral efficiency of 15 bit/s·Hz in the downlink, and 6.75 bit/s·Hz in the up link (meaning that 1 Gbit/s in the downlink should be possible over less than 67 MHz bandwidth).
- System spectral efficiency is, in indoor cases, 3 bit/s·Hz·cell for downlink and 2.25 bit/s·Hz·cell for up link.
- Smooth handovers across heterogeneous networks.

In September 2009, the technology proposals were submitted to the International Telecommunication Union (ITU) as 4G candidates. Basically all proposals are based on two technologies:

- LTE Advanced standardized by the 3GPP
- 802.16m standardized by the IEEE

Implementations of Mobile WiMAX and first-release LTE were largely considered a stopgap solution that would offer a considerable boost until WiMAX 2 (based on the 802.16m specification) and LTE Advanced was deployed. The latter's standard versions were ratified in spring 2011.

The first set of 3GPP requirements on LTE Advanced was approved in June 2008. LTE Advanced was standardized in 2010 as part of Release 10 of the 3GPP specification.

Some sources consider first-release LTE and Mobile WiMAX implementations as pre-4G or near-4G, as they do not fully comply with the planned requirements of 1 Gbit/s for stationary reception and 100 Mbit/s for mobile.

Confusion has been caused by some mobile carriers who have launched products advertised as 4G but which according to some sources are pre-4G versions, commonly referred to as 3.9G, which do not follow the ITU-R defined principles for 4G standards, but today can be called 4G according to ITU-R. Vodafone Netherlands for example, advertised LTE as 4G, while advertising LTE Advanced as their '4G+' service. A common argument for branding 3.9G systems as new-generation is that they use different frequency bands from 3G technologies; that they are based on a new radio-interface paradigm; and that the standards are not backwards compatible with 3G, whilst some of the standards are forwards compatible with IMT-2000 compliant versions of the same standards.

== System standards ==
=== IMT-2000 compliant 4G standards ===
As of October 2010, ITU-R Working Party 5D approved two industry-developed technologies (LTE Advanced and WirelessMAN-Advanced) for inclusion in the ITU's International Mobile Telecommunications Advanced program (IMT-Advanced program), which is focused on global communication systems that will be available several years from now.

==== LTE Advanced ====
LTE Advanced (Long-Term Evolution Advanced) is a candidate for IMT-Advanced standard, formally submitted by the 3GPP organization to ITU-T in the fall 2009, and as of 2013 has been released to the public.The target of 3GPP LTE Advanced is to reach and surpass the ITU requirements. LTE Advanced is essentially an enhancement to LTE. It is not a new technology, but rather an improvement on the existing LTE network. This upgrade path makes it more cost effective for vendors to offer LTE and then upgrade to LTE Advanced which is similar to the upgrade from WCDMA to HSPA. LTE and LTE Advanced will also make use of additional spectrums and multiplexing to allow it to achieve higher data speeds. Coordinated Multi-point Transmission will also allow more system capacity to help handle the enhanced data speeds.

Data speeds of LTE-Advanced
	LTE Advanced
Peak download	1000 Mbit/s
Peak upload	500 Mbit/s

==== IEEE 802.16m or WirelessMAN-Advanced ====
The IEEE 802.16m or WirelessMAN-Advanced (WiMAX 2) evolution of 802.16e is under development, with the objective to fulfill the IMT-Advanced criteria of 1 Gbit/s for stationary reception and 100 Mbit/s for mobile reception.

=== Forerunner versions ===
==== Long-Term Evolution (LTE) ====
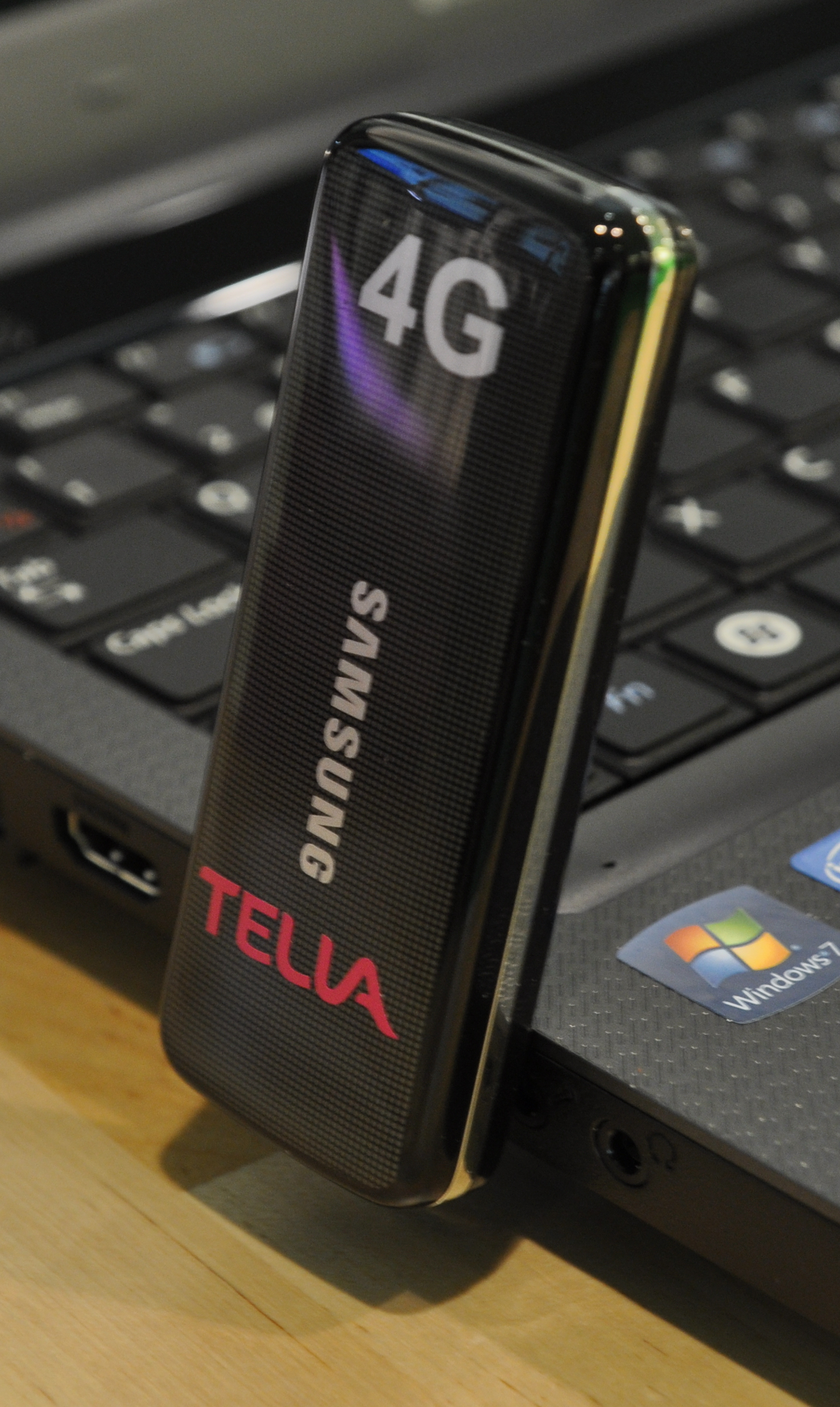
Telia-branded Samsung LTE modem

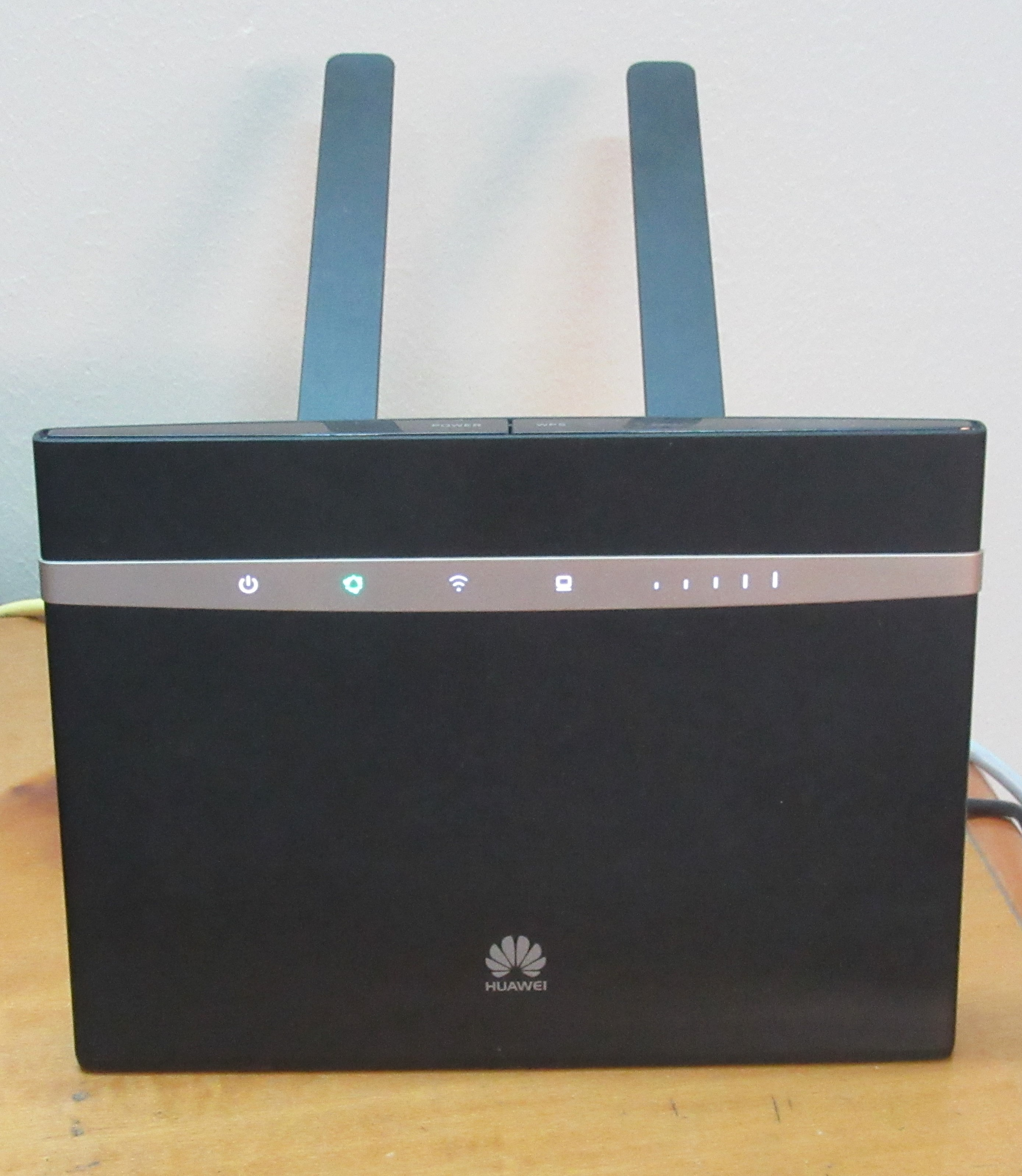
Huawei 4G+ Dual Band Modem

The pre-4G 3GPP Long-Term Evolution (LTE) technology is often branded "4G – LTE", but the first LTE release does not fully comply with the IMT-Advanced requirements. LTE has a theoretical net bit rate capacity of up to 100 Mbit/s in the downlink and 50 Mbit/s in the uplink if a 20 MHz channel is used – and more if multiple-input multiple-output (MIMO), i.e. antenna arrays, are used.

The physical radio interface was at an early stage named High Speed OFDM Packet Access (HSOPA), now named Evolved UMTS Terrestrial Radio Access (E-UTRA). The first LTE USB dongles do not support any other radio interface.

The world's first publicly available LTE service was opened in the two Scandinavian capitals, Stockholm (Ericsson and Nokia Siemens Networks systems) and Oslo (a Huawei system) on December 14, 2009, and branded 4G. The user terminals were manufactured by Samsung. As of November 2012, the five publicly available LTE services in the United States are provided by MetroPCS, Verizon Wireless, AT&T Mobility, U.S. Cellular, Sprint, and T-Mobile US.

T-Mobile Hungary launched a public beta test (called friendly user test) on 7 October 2011, and has offered commercial 4G LTE services since 1 January 2012.

In South Korea, SK Telecom and LG U+ have enabled access to LTE service since 1 July 2011 for data devices, slated to go nationwide by 2012. KT Telecom closed its 2G service by March 2012 and completed nationwide LTE service in the same frequency around 1.8 GHz by June 2012.

In the United Kingdom, LTE services were launched by EE in October 2012, by O2 and Vodafone in August 2013, and by Three in December 2013.

Data speeds of LTE
	LTE
Peak download	150 Mbit/s
Peak upload	50 Mbit/s

==== Mobile WiMAX (IEEE 802.16e) ====
The Mobile WiMAX (IEEE 802.16e-2005) mobile wireless broadband access (MWBA) standard (also known as WiBro in South Korea) is sometimes branded 4G, and offers peak data rates of 128 Mbit/s downlink and 56 Mbit/s uplink over 20 MHz wide channels.

In June 2006, the world's first commercial mobile WiMAX service was opened by KT in Seoul, South Korea.

Sprint has begun using Mobile WiMAX, as of 29 September 2008, branding it as a "4G" network even though the current version does not fulfill the IMT Advanced requirements on 4G systems.

In Russia, Belarus and Nicaragua WiMax broadband internet access were offered by a Russian company Scartel, and was also branded 4G, Yota.

Data speeds of WiMAX
	WiMAX
Peak download	128 Mbit/s
Peak upload	56 Mbit/s

In the latest version of the standard, WiMax 2.1, the standard has been updated to be not compatible with earlier WiMax standard, and is instead interchangeable with LTE-TDD system, effectively merging WiMax standard with LTE.

==== TD-LTE for China market ====
As Long-Term Evolution (LTE) and WiMAX were adopted by the global telecommunications industry, LTE emerged as a primary 4G standard and saw significant adoption in the Chinese market. Although TD-LTE, one of the two LTE air interface variants, was initially less mature than its FDD-LTE counterpart, various domestic and international wireless carriers eventually adopted the technology..

IBM's data shows that 67% of the operators are considering LTE because this is the main source of their future market. The above news also confirms IBM's statement that while only 8% of the operators are considering the use of WiMAX, WiMAX can provide the fastest network transmission to its customers on the market and could challenge LTE.

TD-LTE is not the first 4G wireless mobile broadband network data standard, but it is China's 4G standard that was amended and published by China's largest telecom operator – China Mobile. After a series of field trials, is expected to be released into the commercial phase in the next two years. Ulf Ewaldsson, Ericsson's vice president said: "the Chinese Ministry of Industry and China Mobile in the fourth quarter of this year will hold a large-scale field test, by then, Ericsson will help the hand." But viewing from the current development trend, whether this standard advocated by China Mobile will be widely recognized by the international market is still debatable.

=== Discontinued candidate systems ===
==== UMB (formerly EV-DO Rev. C) ====
UMB (Ultra Mobile Broadband) was the brand name for a discontinued 4G project within the 3GPP2 standardization group to improve the CDMA2000 mobile phone standard for next generation applications and requirements. In November 2008, Qualcomm, UMB's lead sponsor, announced it was ending development of the technology, favoring LTE instead. The objective was to achieve data speeds over 275 Mbit/s downstream and over 75 Mbit/s upstream.

==== Flash-OFDM ====
At an early stage the Flash-OFDM system was expected to be further developed into a 4G standard.

==== iBurst and MBWA (IEEE 802.20) systems ====
The iBurst system (or HC-SDMA, High Capacity Spatial Division Multiple Access) was at an early stage considered to be a 4G predecessor. It was later further developed into the Mobile Broadband Wireless Access (MBWA) system, also known as IEEE 802.20.

== Principal technologies in all candidate systems ==
=== Key features ===
The following key features can be observed in all suggested 4G technologies:

- Physical layer transmission techniques are as follows:
  - MIMO: To attain ultra high spectral efficiency by means of spatial processing including multi-antenna and multi-user MIMO
  - Frequency-domain-equalization, for example multi-carrier modulation (OFDM) in the downlink or single-carrier frequency-domain-equalization (SC-FDE) in the uplink: To exploit the frequency selective channel property without complex equalization
  - Frequency-domain statistical multiplexing, for example (OFDMA) or (single-carrier FDMA) (SC-FDMA, a.k.a. linearly precoded OFDMA, LP-OFDMA) in the uplink: Variable bit rate by assigning different sub-channels to different users based on the channel conditions.
  - Turbo principle error-correcting codes: To minimize the required SNR at the reception side
- Channel-dependent scheduling: To use the time-varying channel
- Link adaptation: Adaptive modulation and error-correcting codes
- Mobile IP utilized for mobility
- IP-based femtocells (home nodes connected to fixed Internet broadband infrastructure)

As opposed to earlier generations, 4G systems do not support circuit switched telephony. IEEE 802.20, UMB and OFDM standards lack soft-handover support, also known as cooperative relaying.

=== Multiplexing and access schemes ===
Recently, new access schemes like Orthogonal FDMA (OFDMA), Single Carrier FDMA (SC-FDMA), Interleaved FDMA, and Multi-carrier CDMA (MC-CDMA) are gaining more importance for the next generation systems. These are based on efficient FFT algorithms and frequency domain equalization, resulting in a lower number of multiplications per second. They also make it possible to control the bandwidth and form the spectrum in a flexible way. However, they require advanced dynamic channel allocation and adaptive traffic scheduling.

WiMax is using OFDMA in the downlink and in the uplink. For the LTE (telecommunication), OFDMA is used for the downlink; by contrast, Single-carrier FDMA is used for the uplink since OFDMA contributes more to the PAPR related issues and results in nonlinear operation of amplifiers. IFDMA provides less power fluctuation and thus requires energy-inefficient linear amplifiers. Similarly, MC-CDMA is in the proposal for the IEEE 802.20 standard. These access schemes offer the same efficiencies as older technologies like CDMA. Apart from this, scalability and higher data rates can be achieved.

The other important advantage of the above-mentioned access techniques is that they require less complexity for equalization at the receiver. This is an added advantage especially in the MIMO environments since the spatial multiplexing transmission of MIMO systems inherently require high complexity equalization at the receiver.

In addition to improvements in these multiplexing systems, improved modulation techniques are being used. Whereas earlier standards largely used Phase-shift keying, more efficient systems such as 64QAM are being proposed for use with the 3GPP Long-Term Evolution standards.

=== IPv6 support ===
Unlike 3G, which is based on two parallel infrastructures consisting of circuit switched and packet switched network nodes, 4G is based on packet switching only. This requires low-latency data transmission.

As IPv4 addresses are (nearly) exhausted, (Note: The exact exhaustion status is difficult to determine, as it is unknown how many unused addresses exist at ISPs, and how many of the addresses that are permanently unused by their owners can still be freed and transferred to others.) IPv6 is essential to support the large number of wireless-enabled devices that communicate using IP. By increasing the number of IP addresses available, IPv6 removes the need for network address translation (NAT), a method of sharing a limited number of addresses among a larger group of devices, which has a number of problems and limitations. When using IPv6, some kind of NAT is still required for communication with legacy IPv4 devices that are not also IPv6-connected.

As of June 2009, Verizon has posted specifications that require any 4G devices on its network to support IPv6.

=== Advanced antenna systems ===
The performance of radio communications depends on an antenna system, termed smart or intelligent antenna. Recently, multiple antenna technologies are emerging to achieve the goal of 4G systems such as high rate, high reliability, and long range communications. In the early 1990s, to cater for the growing data rate needs of data communication, many transmission schemes were proposed. One technology, spatial multiplexing, gained importance for its bandwidth conservation and power efficiency. Spatial multiplexing involves deploying multiple antennas at the transmitter and at the receiver. Independent streams can then be transmitted simultaneously from all the antennas. This technology, called MIMO (as a branch of intelligent antenna), multiplies the base data rate by (the smaller of) the number of transmit antennas or the number of receive antennas. Apart from this, the reliability in transmitting high speed data in the fading channel can be improved by using more antennas at the transmitter or at the receiver. This is called transmit or receive diversity. Both transmit/receive diversity and transmit spatial multiplexing are categorized into the space-time coding techniques, which does not necessarily require the channel knowledge at the transmitter. The other category is closed-loop multiple antenna technologies, which require channel knowledge at the transmitter.

=== Open-wireless Architecture and Software-defined radio (SDR) ===
One of the key technologies for 4G and beyond is called Open Wireless Architecture (OWA), supporting multiple wireless air interfaces in an open architecture platform.

SDR is one form of open wireless architecture (OWA). Since 4G is a collection of wireless standards, the final form of a 4G device will constitute various standards. This can be efficiently realized using SDR technology, which is categorized to the area of the radio convergence.

== History of 4G and pre-4G technologies ==
In 1991, WiLAN founders Hatim Zaghloul and Michel Fattouche invented wideband orthogonal frequency-division multiplexing (WOFDM), the basis for wideband wireless communication applications, including 4G mobile communications.

Cellular network standards and generation timeline.

The 4G system was originally envisioned by the DARPA, the US Defense Advanced Research Projects Agency. DARPA selected the distributed architecture and end-to-end Internet protocol (IP), and believed at an early stage in peer-to-peer networking in which every mobile device would be both a transceiver and a router for other devices in the network, eliminating the spoke-and-hub weakness of 2G and 3G cellular systems. Since the 2.5G GPRS system, cellular systems have provided dual infrastructures: packet switched nodes for data services, and circuit switched nodes for voice calls. In 4G systems, the circuit-switched infrastructure is abandoned and only a packet-switched network is provided, while 2.5G and 3G systems require both packet-switched and circuit-switched network nodes, i.e. two infrastructures in parallel. This means that in 4G traditional voice calls are replaced by IP telephony.

- In 2002, the strategic vision for 4G—which ITU designated as IMT Advanced—was laid out.
- In 2004, LTE was first proposed by NTT DoCoMo of Japan.
- In 2005, OFDMA transmission technology is chosen as candidate for the HSOPA downlink, later renamed 3GPP Long-Term Evolution (LTE) air interface E-UTRA.
- In November 2005, KT Corporation demonstrated mobile WiMAX service in Busan, South Korea.
- In April 2006, KT Corporation started the world's first commercial mobile WiMAX service in Seoul, South Korea.
- In mid-2006, Sprint announced that it would invest about US$5 billion in a WiMAX technology buildout over the next few years ($7.99 billion in real terms). Since that time Sprint has faced many setbacks that have resulted in steep quarterly losses. On 7 May 2008, Sprint, Imagine, Google, Intel, Comcast, Bright House, and Time Warner announced a pooling of an average of 120 MHz of spectrum; Sprint merged its Xohm WiMAX division with Clearwire to form a company which will take the name "Clear".
- In February 2007, the Japanese company NTT DoCoMo tested a 4G communication system prototype with 4×4 MIMO called VSF-OFCDM at 100 Mbit/s while moving, and 1 Gbit/s while stationary. NTT DoCoMo completed a trial in which they reached a maximum packet transmission rate of approximately 5 Gbit/s in the downlink with 12×12 MIMO using a 100 MHz frequency bandwidth while moving at 10 km/h, and is planning on releasing the first commercial network in 2010.
- In September 2007, NTT Docomo demonstrated e-UTRA data rates of 200 Mbit/s with power consumption below 100 mW during the test.
- In January 2008, a U.S. Federal Communications Commission (FCC) spectrum auction for the 700 MHz former analog TV frequencies began. As a result, the biggest share of the spectrum went to Verizon Wireless and the next biggest to AT&T. Both of these companies have stated their intention of supporting LTE.
- In January 2008, EU commissioner Viviane Reding suggested re-allocation of 500–800 MHz spectrum for wireless communication, including WiMAX.
- On 15 February 2008, Skyworks Solutions released a front-end module for e-UTRAN.
- In November 2008, ITU-R established the detailed performance requirements of IMT-Advanced, by issuing a Circular Letter calling for candidate Radio Access Technologies (RATs) for IMT-Advanced.
- In April 2008, just after receiving the circular letter, the 3GPP organized a workshop on IMT-Advanced where it was decided that LTE Advanced, an evolution of current LTE standard, will meet or even exceed IMT-Advanced requirements following the ITU-R agenda.
- In April 2008, LG and Nortel demonstrated e-UTRA data rates of 50 Mbit/s while travelling at 110 km/h.
- On 12 November 2008, HTC announced the first WiMAX-enabled mobile phone, the Max 4G
- On 15 December 2008, San Miguel Corporation, the largest food and beverage conglomerate in southeast Asia, has signed a memorandum of understanding with Qatar Telecom QSC (Qtel) to build wireless broadband and mobile communications projects in the Philippines. The joint-venture formed wi-tribe Philippines, which offers 4G in the country. Around the same time Globe Telecom rolled out the first WiMAX service in the Philippines.
- On 3 March 2009, Lithuania's LRTC announcing the first operational "4G" mobile WiMAX network in Baltic states.
- In December 2009, Sprint began advertising "4G" service in selected cities in the United States, despite average download speeds of only 3–6 Mbit/s with peak speeds of 10 Mbit/s (not available in all markets).
- On 14 December 2009, the first commercial LTE deployment was in the Scandinavian capitals Stockholm and Oslo by the Swedish-Finnish network operator TeliaSonera and its Norwegian brandname NetCom (Norway). TeliaSonera branded the network "4G". The modem devices on offer were manufactured by Samsung (dongle GT-B3710), and the network infrastructure created by Huawei (in Oslo) and Ericsson (in Stockholm). TeliaSonera plans to roll out nationwide LTE across Sweden, Norway and Finland. TeliaSonera used spectral bandwidth of 10 MHz, and single-in-single-out, which should provide physical layer net bit rates of up to 50 Mbit/s downlink and 25 Mbit/s in the uplink. Introductory tests showed a TCP throughput of 42.8 Mbit/s downlink and 5.3 Mbit/s uplink in Stockholm.
- On 4 June 2010, Sprint released the first WiMAX smartphone in the US, the HTC Evo 4G.
- On November 4, 2010, the Samsung Craft offered by MetroPCS is the first commercially available LTE smartphone
- On 6 December 2010, at the ITU World Radiocommunication Seminar 2010, the ITU stated that LTE, WiMAX and similar "evolved 3G technologies" could be considered "4G".
- In 2011, Argentina's Claro launched a pre-4G HSPA+ network in the country.
- In 2011, Thailand's Truemove-H launched a pre-4G HSPA+ network with nationwide availability.
- On March 17, 2011, the HTC Thunderbolt offered by Verizon in the U.S. was the second LTE smartphone to be sold commercially.
- In February 2012, Ericsson demonstrated mobile-TV over LTE, utilizing the new eMBMS service (enhanced Multimedia Broadcast Multicast Service).

Since 2009, the LTE-Standard has strongly evolved over the years, resulting in many deployments by various operators across the globe. For an overview of commercial LTE networks and their respective historic development see: List of LTE networks. Among the vast range of deployments, many operators are considering the deployment and operation of LTE networks. A compilation of planned LTE deployments can be found at: List of planned LTE networks.

== Disadvantages ==
4G introduces a potential inconvenience for those who travel internationally or wish to switch carriers. In order to make and receive 4G voice calls (VoLTE), the subscriber handset must not only have a matching frequency band (and in some cases require unlocking), it must also have the matching enablement settings for the local carrier and/or country. While a phone purchased from a given carrier can be expected to work with that carrier, making 4G voice calls on another carrier's network (including international roaming) may be impossible without a software update specific to the local carrier and the phone model in question, which may or may not be available (although fallback to 2G/3G for voice calling may still be possible if a 2G/3G network is available with a matching frequency band).

== Beyond 4G research ==
A major issue in 4G systems is to make the high bit rates available in a larger portion of the cell, especially to users in an exposed position in between several base stations. In current research, this issue is addressed by macro-diversity techniques, also known as group cooperative relay, and also by Beam-Division Multiple Access (BDMA).

Pervasive networks are an amorphous and at present entirely hypothetical concept where the user can be simultaneously connected to several wireless access technologies and can seamlessly move between them (See vertical handoff, IEEE 802.21). These access technologies can be Wi-Fi, UMTS, EDGE, or any other future access technology. Included in this concept is also smart-radio (also known as cognitive radio) technology to efficiently manage spectrum use and transmission power as well as the use of mesh routing protocols to create a pervasive network.

== The future of 4G ==
As of 2023, many countries and regions have started the transition from 4G to 5G, the next generation of cellular technology. 5G promises even faster speeds, lower latency, and the ability to connect a vast number of devices simultaneously.

4G networks are expected to coexist with 5G networks for several years, providing coverage in areas where 5G is not available.

== Past 4G networks ==
Country	Network	Shutdown date	Standard	Notes
Canada	Xplore Mobile	2022-08-31	LTE	
Jamaica	Digicel	2018-10-31	WiMAX	
Macau	Smartone	2024-11-11	LTE	Smartone ceased operation in Macau and surrendered its license to government. Existing customers were transferred to CTM.
Macau	3	2026-12-01	LTE	Hutchison left Macau market in January 2026 and sold its business to CTM, but kept independent operation and its own telecommunications license until its closure. Existing customers will transfer to CTM.
Malaysia	Yes 4G	2019-10-01	WiMAX	
Nepal	Nepal Telecom	2021-12-31	WiMAX	
Trinidad and Tobago	Blink bmobile (TSTT)	2015-03-03	WiMAX	
United States	Sprint	2016-03-31	WiMAX	
United States	T-Mobile (Sprint)	2022-06-30	LTE	
United States	T-Mobile	2035	LTE	

== See also ==
- 1G
- 2G
- 3G
- 5G
- 6G
- 4G-LTE filter
- Comparison of mobile phone standards
- Comparison of wireless data standards
- Wireless device radiation and health

== Notes ==
Preceded by 3rd Generation (3G)	Mobile Telephony Generations	Succeeded by 5th Generation (5G)
