= Wi-tribe =

Pakistani internet provider

wi-tribe
- Type: Public Limited Company
- Industry: Internet service provider
- Founded: April 2007
- Defunct: October 2021
- Headquarters: Islamabad, Pakistan
- Products: LTE Advanced 4.5G Wi-Max Internet
- Parent: HB Group
- Website: www.wi-tribe.pk

wi-tribe (/ˈwaɪˌtraɪb/ WYE-trybe) was a Pakistani Internet service provider that operated in four major cities; Islamabad, Rawalpindi, Lahore, and Karachi until its license was revoked by Pakistan Telecommunication Authority because of frequent service interruption in October 2021.

== History ==
In 2009, the wi-tribe group, owned by Qatar Telecom (now Ooredoo) launched its largest operations in Pakistan. In Pakistan, wi-tribe is operating in Islamabad, Karachi, Lahore, and Rawalpindi.

Qatar Telecom invested in WiMAX technology which, was the leading technology at the time, and set up over 600 towers for base stations across its network at a cost close to US$200 million.

In March 2016, wi-tribe was acquired by the HB Group from Ooredoo.

In 2020, due to a critical problem with the tower management business, edotco, the company ceased operations in Lahore. The situation arose because of a disagreement between the companies, which worsened after the departure of the highly regarded edotco group head, Suresh Sidhu; ostensibly, the disagreement was over a service-level agreement and the renegotiation of tower rentals due to the expiration of land-owner leases, with edotco negotiating in a way that would result in huge increases and premiums being demanded from wi-tribe. Here, edotco was trying to use the deliberate shutdown of wi-tribe base stations on edotco towers as a bargaining chip in a business dispute. As a kind of vengeance, wi-tribe stopped making payments. The now-fired CEO of edotco Pakistan, Arif Hussain, responded by shutting down the towers in key cities, leaving customers without access to broadband.

=== Pakistan's first 4.5G LTE advanced network launched ===
In November 2016, the management considered investing in 4G LTE home broadband to upgrade its services to meet customer expectations for speed and capacity. The wi-tribe board later announced that it would skip a generation and instead of adopting 4G technology, it would shift to 4.5G LTE Advanced (LTE-A) technology.

In February 2017, wi-tribe announced that it had signed a contract with Huawei to upgrade its entire network from WiMAX to an LTE-A (4.5G) network, the most advanced broadband technology in the world.

This deployment represented the first such network in South Asia and the Middle East operating 4.5G LTE-A on the 3.5GHz spectrum (3500 MHz) band.

The new 4.5G LTE-A network was installed at wi-tribe's Head Office in F-8 Islamabad, using equipment from Huawei, with whom wi-tribe signed a $15 million USD contract and a strategic partnership for upgrade of wi-tribes network to LTE-A covering a possibility of five cities, namely Islamabad, Rawalpindi, Karachi, Lahore, and Faisalabad. The network is currently undergoing large scale field tests having proven extremely successful in lab tests and will be made available to the public in September 2017.

In September 2017, on schedule, wi-tribe launched its 4.5G LTE Advanced services in Pakistan. In October 2017, wi-tribe introduced Pakistan's first one terabyte package, which garnered much attention from local consumers. From 2018 wi-tribe rolled out its 4.5G LTE advanced network across Islamabad, Lahore, and Karachi.

The Pakistani President recognized the 4.5G achievement and awarded wi-tribe the Pakistan New Technology Innovation Award. At the beginning of 2019 Abbas Bokhari, a veteran of the LDI industry, took over as the CEO.

Shahid Farooq took on the role of Chairman of wi-tribe following Shahid Malik departing to take on other challenges in January 2019.

In 2020 Sajjad Hasan Jaffri, a two-decade plus finance veteran, took over as the Group CFO with a focus on optimization across the group.

=== Acquisition of Qubee from PE Fund New Silk Route ===
In late 2018 the HB Group acquired Qubee, a fellow broadband operator from US-based private equity fund New Silk Route. Qubee's network used WiMAX technology and HB's objective was to upgrade the technology and also create a business and corporate customer entity and shift the traditionally more challenging consumers to wi-tribe.

=== First successful 5G trials in Pakistan ===
In 2019, wi-tribe partnered with mobile operator Zong to complete the first successful first 5G trials in Pakistan
