= IMT Advanced =

ITU requirements for 4G mobile telecommunications

International Mobile Telecommunications-Advanced (IMT-Advanced Standard) are the requirements issued by the ITU Radiocommunication Sector (ITU-R) of the International Telecommunication Union (ITU) in 2008 for what is marketed as 4G (or in Turkey as 4.5G) mobile phone and Internet access service.

== 4G ==
=== Description ===
An IMT-Advanced system is expected to provide a comprehensive and secure all-IP based mobile broadband solution to laptop computer wireless modems, smartphones, and other mobile devices. Facilities such as ultra-broadband Internet access, voice over IP, gaming services, and streamed multimedia may be provided to users.

IMT-Advanced is intended to accommodate the quality of service (QoS) and rate requirements set by further development of existing applications like mobile broadband access, Multimedia Messaging Service (MMS), video chat, mobile TV, but also new services like high-definition television (HDTV). 4G may allow roaming with wireless local area networks and may interact with digital video broadcasting systems. It was meant to go beyond the International Mobile Telecommunications-2000 requirements, which specify mobile phones systems marketed as 3G.

=== Requirements ===
Specific requirements of the IMT-Advanced report included:

- Based on an all-IP packet switched network.
- Interoperability with existing wireless standards.
- A nominal data rate of 100 Mbit/s while the client physically moves at high speeds relative to the station, and 1 Gbit/s while the client and station are in relatively fixed positions.
- Dynamically share and use network resources to support more simultaneous users per cell.
- Scalable channel bandwidth 5–20 MHz, optionally up to 40 MHz
- Peak link spectral efficiency of 15 bit/s/Hz in the downlink and 6.75 bit/s/Hz in the uplink (meaning that 1 Gbit/s in the downlink should be possible over less than 67 MHz bandwidth)
- System spectral efficiency of up to 3 bit/s/Hz/cell in the downlink and 2.25 bit/s/Hz/cell for indoor usage
- Seamless connectivity and global roaming across multiple networks with smooth handovers
- Ability to offer high-quality service for multimedia support

The first set of 3GPP requirements on LTE Advanced was approved in June 2008.

A summary of the technologies that have been studied as the basis for LTE Advanced is included in a technical report.

While the ITU adopts requirements and recommendations for technologies that would be used for future communications, they do not actually perform the development work themselves, and countries do not consider them binding standards. Other trade groups and standards bodies such as the Institute of Electrical and Electronics Engineers, the WiMAX Forum, and 3GPP also have a role.

=== Principal technologies ===
Physical layer transmission techniques expected to be used include:

- MIMO: To attain ultra-high spectral efficiency using spatial processing including multi-antenna and multi-user MIMO
- Frequency-domain-equalization, for example "multi-carrier modulation" (OFDM) in the downlink or "single-carrier frequency-domain-equalization" (SC-FDE) in the uplink: To exploit the frequency selective channel property without complex equalization.
- Frequency-domain statistical multiplexing, for example (OFDMA) or (single-carrier FDMA) (SC-FDMA, Linearly precoded OFDMA, LP-OFDMA) in the uplink: Variable bit rate by assigning different sub-channels to different users based on the channel conditions
- Turbo principle error-correcting codes: To minimize the required signal-to-noise ratio at the reception side
- Channel-dependent scheduling: To utilize the time-varying channel.
- Link adaptation: Adaptive modulation and error-correcting codes.
- Relaying, including fixed relay networks, and the cooperative relaying concept, known as multi-mode protocol.

== Predecessors ==
=== Long Term Evolution ===
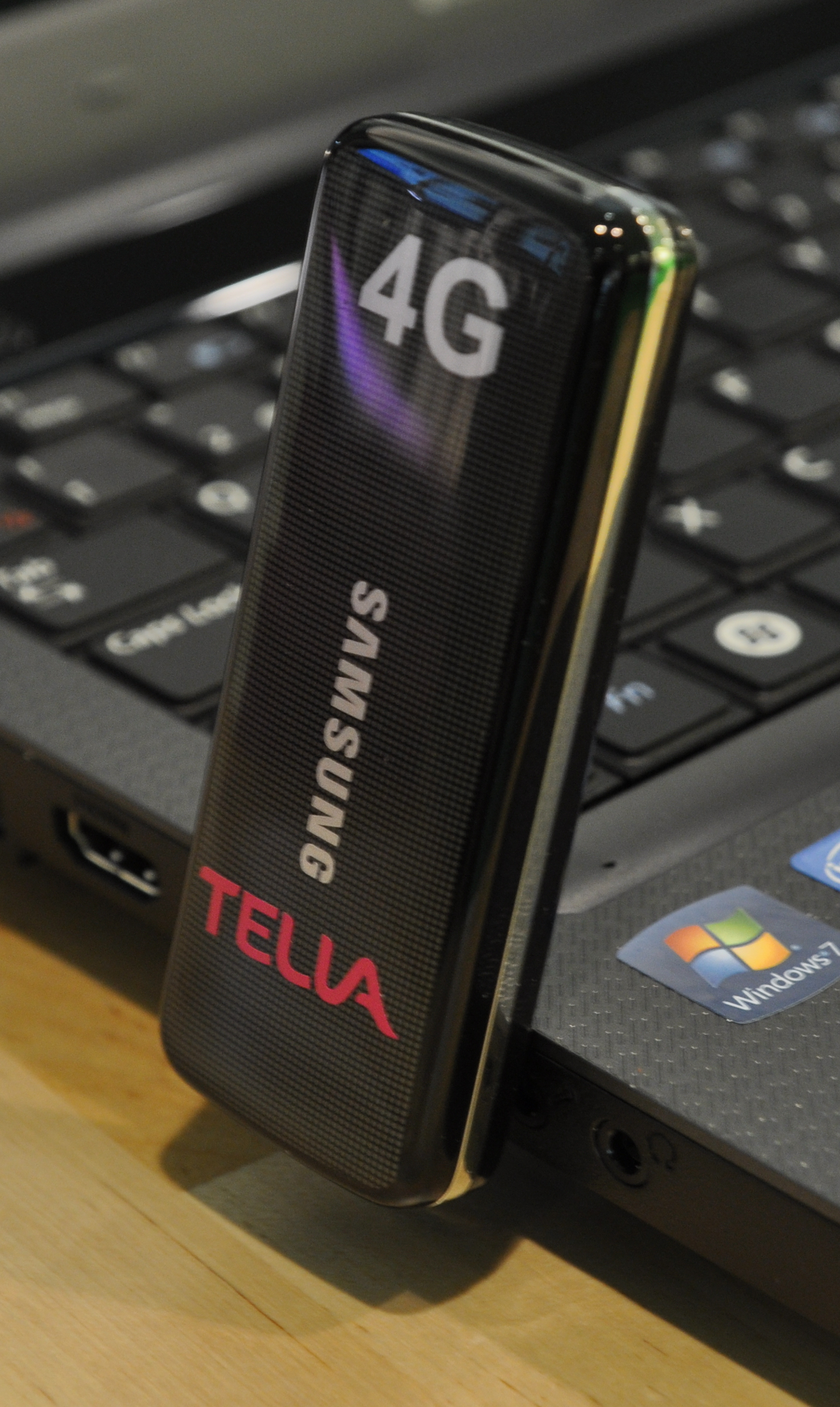
Telia-branded Samsung LTE modem

Long Term Evolution (LTE) has a theoretical net bitrate maximum capacity of 100 Mbit/s in the downlink and 50 Mbit/s in the uplink if a 20 MHz channel is used. The capacity is more if a MIMO (multiple-input and multiple-output) antenna array is used. The physical radio interface was at an early stage named "High-Speed Orthogonal Packet Access" and is now named E-UTRA.

The CDMA's spread spectrum radio technology that was used in 3G systems and cdmaOne has been abandoned. It was replaced by orthogonal frequency-division multiple access and other frequency-division multiple access schemes. This is combined with MIMO antenna arrays, dynamic channel allocation, and channel-dependent scheduling.

The first publicly available LTE services were branded "4G" and opened in Sweden's capital city Stockholm (Ericsson system) and Norway's capital city Oslo (a Huawei system) on 14 December 2009. The user terminals were manufactured by Samsung. All three major U.S. wireless carriers offer LTE services.

In South Korea, SK Telecom and LG U+ have enabled access to LTE service since July 2011 for data devices, slated to go nationwide by 2012.

=== Mobile WiMAX (IEEE 802.16e) ===
The Mobile WiMAX (IEEE 802.16e-2005) mobile wireless broadband access (MWBA) standard (marketed as WiBro in South Korea) is sometimes branded 4G, and offers peak data rates of 128 Mbit/s downlink and 56 Mbit/s uplink over 20 MHz wide channels.

The first commercial mobile WiMAX service was opened by KT in Seoul, South Korea in June 2006.

In September 2008, Sprint Nextel marketed Mobile WiMAX as a "4G" network even though it did not fulfill the IMT Advanced requirements.

In Russia, Belarus, and Nicaragua, WiMax broadband internet access is offered by the Russian company Scartel and is also branded 4G, Yota.

Data speeds of WiMAX
| | WiMAX |
|---|---|
| Peak download | 128 Mbit/s |
| Peak upload | 56 Mbit/s |

=== Ultra Mobile Broadband ===
Ultra Mobile Broadband (UMB) was the brand name for a discontinued 4G project within the 3GPP2 standardization group to improve the CDMA2000 mobile phone standard for next-generation applications and requirements. In November 2008, Qualcomm, UMB's lead sponsor, announced it was ending development of the technology, favoring LTE instead. The objective was to achieve data speeds over 275 Mbit/s downstream and over 75 Mbit/s upstream.

=== Flash-OFDM ===
At an early stage, the Flash-OFDM system was expected to be further developed into a 4G standard.

=== iBurst and MBWA ===
The iBurst technology, using High Capacity Spatial Division Multiple Access (HC-SDMA), was at an early stage considered as a 4G predecessor. It was incorporated by the Mobile Broadband Wireless Access (MBWA) working group into the IEEE 802.20 standard in 2008.

== Candidate systems ==
In October 2010, ITU-R Working Party 5D approved two industry-developed technologies. On December 6, 2010, ITU noted that while current versions of LTE, WiMax and other evolved 3G technologies do not fulfill IMT-Advanced requirements for 4G, some may use the term "4G" in an "undefined" fashion to represent forerunners to IMT-Advanced that show "a substantial level of improvement in performance and capabilities with respect to the initial third generation systems now deployed."

=== LTE Advanced ===
LTE Advanced (Long-term-evolution Advanced) was formally submitted by the 3GPP organization to ITU-T in the fall of 2009, and was released in 2011. The target of 3GPP LTE Advanced was to reach and surpass the ITU requirements. LTE Advanced is an improvement on the existing LTE network. Release 10 of LTE is expected to achieve the LTE Advanced speeds. Release 8 in 2009 supported up to 300 Mbit/s download speeds which were still short of the IMT-Advanced standards.

=== WiMAX Release 2 (IEEE 802.16m) ===
The WirelessMAN-Advanced evolution of IEEE 802.16e was published in May 2011 as standard IEEE 802.16m-2011. The relevant industry promoting the technology gave it the marketing name of WiMAX Release 2. It had an objective to fulfill the IMT-Advanced criteria. The IMT-Advanced group formally approved this technology as meeting its criteria in October 2010. In the second half of 2012, the 802.16m-2011 standard was rolled up into the 802.16-2012 standard, excluding the WirelessMAN-Advanced radio interface part of the 802.16m-2011 standard, which got moved to IEEE Std 802.16.1-2012.

== Comparison ==
The following table shows a comparison of IMT-Advanced candidate systems as well as other competing technologies.

Comparison of mobile Internet access methods
| Common name | Family | Primary use | Radio tech | Downstream (Mbit/s) | Upstream (Mbit/s) | Notes |
|---|---|---|---|---|---|---|
| HSPA+ | 3GPP | Mobile Internet | CDMA/TDMA/FDD; MIMO | 21; 42; 84; 672 | 5.8; 11.5; 22; 168 | HSPA+ is widely deployed. Revision 11 of the 3GPP states that HSPA+ is expected to have a throughput capacity of 672 Mbit/s. |
| LTE | 3GPP | Mobile Internet | OFDMA/TDMA/MIMO/SC-FDMA/for LTE-FDD/for LTE-TDD | 100 Cat3; 150 Cat4; 300 Cat5; 25065 Cat17; 1658 Cat19 (in 20 MHz FDD) | 50 Cat3/4; 75 Cat5; 2119 Cat17; 13563 Cat19 (in 20 MHz FDD) | LTE-Advanced Pro offers rates in excess of 3 Gbit/s to mobile users. |
| WiMax rel 1 | 802.16 | WirelessMAN | MIMO-SOFDMA | 37 (10 MHz TDD) | 17 (10 MHz TDD) | With 2x2 MIMO. |
| WiMax rel 1.5 | 802.16-2009 | WirelessMAN | MIMO-SOFDMA | 83 (20 MHz TDD); 141 (2x20 MHz FDD) | 46 (20 MHz TDD); 138 (2x20 MHz FDD) | With 2x2 MIMO.Enhanced with 20 MHz channels in 802.16-2009 |
| WiMAX rel 2.0 | 802.16m | WirelessMAN | MIMO-SOFDMA | 2x2 MIMO; 110 (20 MHz TDD); 183 (2x20 MHz FDD); 4x4 MIMO; 219 (20 MHz TDD); 365 (2x20 MHz FDD) | 2x2 MIMO; 70 (20 MHz TDD); 188 (2x20 MHz FDD); 4x4 MIMO; 140 (20 MHz TDD); 376 (2x20 MHz FDD) | Also, low mobility users can aggregate multiple channels to get a download throughput of up to 1 Gbit/s |
| Flash-OFDM | Flash-OFDM | Mobile Internet mobility up to 200 mph (350 km/h) | Flash-OFDM | 5.3; 10.6; 15.9 | 1.8; 3.6; 5.4 | Mobile range 30 km (18 miles); Extended range 55 km (34 miles) |
| HIPERMAN | HIPERMAN | Mobile Internet | OFDM | 56.9 | | |
| Wi-Fi | 802.11 (11ax) | Wireless LAN | OFDM/OFDMA/CSMA/MIMO/MU-MIMO/Half duplex | 9600 Wi-Fi 6 | | Antenna, RF front end enhancements and minor protocol timer tweaks have helped deploy long range P2P networks compromising on radial coverage, throughput and/or spectra efficiency (310 km & 382 km) |
| iBurst | 802.20 | Mobile Internet | HC-SDMA/TDD/MIMO | 95 | 36 | Cell Radius: 3–12 km Speed: 250 km/h Spectral Efficiency: 13 bits/s/Hz/cell; Spectrum Reuse Factor: "1" |
| EDGE Evolution | GSM | Mobile Internet | TDMA/FDD | 1.6 | 0.5 | 3GPP Release 7 |
| UMTS W-CDMA HSPA (HSDPA+HSUPA) | 3GPP | Mobile Internet | CDMA/FDD CDMA/FDD/MIMO | 0.384; 14.4 | 0.384; 5.76 | HSDPA is widely deployed. Typical downlink rates today 2 Mbit/s, ~200 kbit/s uplink; HSPA+ downlink up to 56 Mbit/s. |
| UMTS-TDD | 3GPP | Mobile Internet | CDMA/TDD | 16 | | Reported speeds according to IPWireless using 16QAM modulation similar to HSDPA+HSUPA |
| EV-DO Rel. 0 EV-DO Rev.A EV-DO Rev.B | 3GPP2 | Mobile Internet | CDMA/FDD | 2.45; 3.1; 4.9xN | 0.15; 1.8; 1.8xN | Rev B note: N is the number of 1.25 MHz carriers used. EV-DO is not designed for voice, and requires a fallback to 1xRTT when a voice call is placed or received. |

Notes: All speeds are theoretical maximums and will vary by a number of factors, including the use of external antennas, distance from the tower and the ground speed (e.g. communications on a train may be poorer than when standing still). Usually the bandwidth is shared between several terminals. The performance of each technology is determined by a number of constraints, including the spectral efficiency of the technology, the cell sizes used, and the amount of spectrum available.

For more comparison tables, see bit rate progress trends, comparison of mobile phone standards, spectral efficiency comparison table and OFDM system comparison table.
