= WiMAX MIMO =

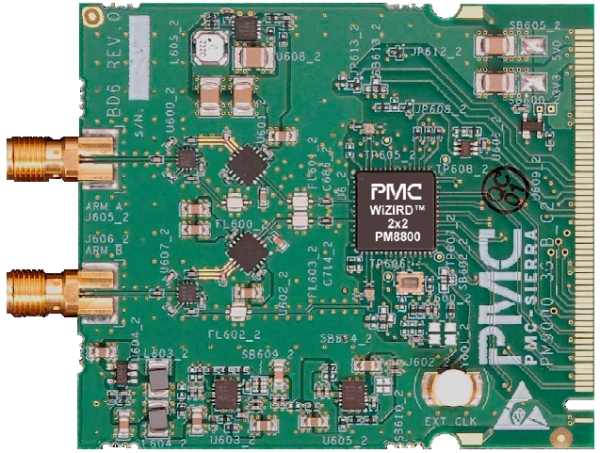
Picture of a WiMAX MIMO board with a WiMAX MIMO RFIC

WiMAX MIMO refers to the use of Multiple-input multiple-output communications (MIMO) technology on WiMAX, which is the technology brand name for the implementation of the standard IEEE 802.16.

== Background ==
=== WiMAX ===
WiMAX is the technology brand name for the implementation of the standard IEEE 802.16, which specifies the air interface at the PHY (Physical layer) and at the MAC (Medium Access Control layer). Aside from specifying the support of various channel bandwidths and adaptive modulation and coding, it also specifies the support for MIMO antennas to provide good Non-line-of-sight (NLOS) characteristics.

See Also: WiMax Forum

=== MIMO ===
MIMO stands for Multiple Input and Multiple Output, and refers to the technology where there are multiple antennas at the base station and multiple antennas at the mobile device. Typical usage of multiple antenna technology includes cellular phones with two antennas, laptops with two antennas (e.g. built in the left and right side of the screen), as well as CPE devices with multiple sprouting antennas.

The predominant cellular network implementation is to have multiple antennas at the base station and a single antenna on the mobile device. This minimizes the cost of the mobile radio. As the costs for radio frequency (RF) components in mobile devices go down, second antennas in mobile device may become more common. Multiple mobile device antennas are currently used in Wi-Fi technology (e.g. IEEE 802.11n), where WiFi-enabled cellular phones, laptops and other devices often have two or more antennas.

== MIMO Technology in WiMAX ==
WiMAX implementations that use MIMO technology have become important. The use of MIMO technology improves the reception and allows for a better reach and rate of transmission. The implementation of MIMO also gives WiMAX a significant increase in spectral efficiency.

=== MIMO auto-negotiation ===
The 802.16 defined MIMO configuration is negotiated dynamically between each individual base station and mobile station. The 802.16 specification supports the ability to support a mix of mobile stations with different MIMO capabilities. This helps to maximize the sector throughput by leveraging the different capabilities of a diverse set of vendor mobile stations.

=== Space Time Code ===
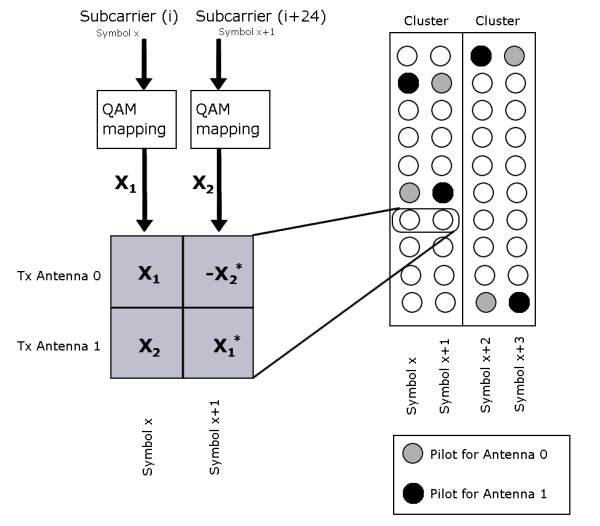
Space Time Code diagram

The 802.16 specification supports the Multiple-input and single-output (MISO) technique of Transmit Diversity, which is commonly referred to Space Time Code (STC). With this method, two or more antennas are employed at the transmitter and one antenna at the receiver. The use of multiple receive antennas (thus MIMO) can further improve the reception of STC transmitted signals.

With a Transmit Diversity rate = 1 (a.k.a. "Matrix A" in the 802.16 standard), different data bit constellations are transferred on two different antennas during the same symbol. The conjugate and/or inverse of the same two constellations are transferred again on the same antennas during the next symbol. The data transfer rate with STC remains the same as the baseline case. The received signal is more robust with this method due to the transmission redundancy. This configuration delivers similar performance to the case of two receive antennas and one transmitter antenna.

=== Spatial Multiplexing ===
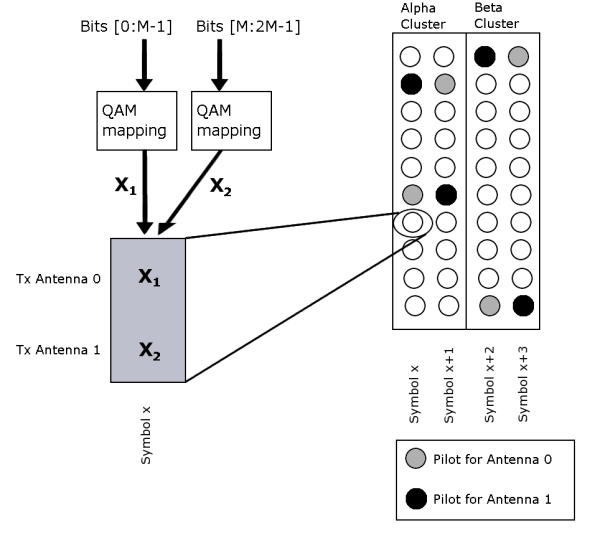
Spatial Multiplexing

The 802.16 specification also supports the MIMO technique of Spatial Multiplexing (SMX), also known as Transmit Diversity rate = 2 (a.k.a. "Matrix B" in the 802.16 standard). Instead of transmitting the same bit over two antennas, this method transmits one data bit from the first antenna, and another bit from the second antenna simultaneously, per symbol. As long as the receiver has more than one antenna and the signal is of sufficient quality, the receiver can separate the signals. This method involves added complexity and expense at both the transmitter and receiver. However, with two transmit antennas and two receive antennas, data can be transmitted twice as fast as compared systems using Space Time Codes with only one receive antenna.

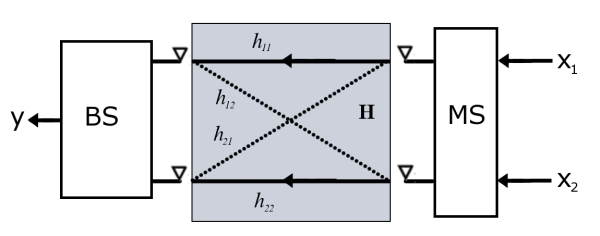
2xSMX or STC+2xMRC

==== WiMAX Network use of Spatial Multiplexing ====
One specific use of Spatial Multiplexing is to apply it to users who have the best signal quality, so that less time is spent transmitting to them. Users whose signal quality is too low to allow the spatially multiplexed signals to be resolved stay with conventional transmission. This allows an operator to offer higher data rates to some users and/or to serve more users. The WiMAX specification's dynamic negotiation mechanism helps enable this use.

== WiMAX MISO/MIMO with four antennas ==
The 802.16 specification also supports the use of four antennas. Three configurations are supported.

=== WiMAX four antenna mode 1 ===
With rate = 1 using four antennas, data is transmitted four times per symbol, where each time the data is conjugated and/or inverted. This does not change the data rate, but does give the signal more robustness and avoids sudden increases in error rates.

=== WiMAX four antenna mode 2 ===
With rate = 2 using four antennas, the data rate is only doubled, but increases in robustness since the same data is transmitted twice as compared to only once with using two antennas.

=== WiMAX four antenna Matrix C mode ===
The third configuration that is only available using four antennas is Matrix C, where a different data bit is transmitted from the four antennas per symbol, which gives it four times the baseline data rate.

Comparison of STC and SMX
Data Rate
		1x	2x	4x
	4	STC (Matrix A)	STC & SMX (Matrix B)	SMX only (Matrix C)
Number of Transmit Antennas	2	STC (Matrix A)	SMX (Matrix B)	not possible
	1	Baseline Case	not possible	not possible

Comparison of number of Transmitting and Receiving Antennas
Rx
		1	2	3	4
	4	STC (Matrix A)	2xSMX (Matrix B); STC + 2xMRC (Matrix A)	2xSMX (Matrix B); STC + 3xMRC (Matrix A)	4xSMX (Matrix C)
Tx	2	STC (Matrix A)	2xSMX (Matrix B); STC + 2xMRC (Matrix A)	2xSMX (Matrix B); STC + 3xMRC (Matrix A)	STC + 4xMRC (Matrix A)
	1	Baseline Case	Uplink: Uplink Collaborative MIMO; Downlink: MRC	MRC	MRC

Note: MRC (Maximum Ratio Combining) is vendor discretionary and improves rate and range. In WiMAX, MRC at the Base Station is sometimes also referred to as Receive Beamforming.

See also: Space Time Coding and Spatial Multiplexing

== Other advanced MIMO techniques applied to WiMAX ==
=== Uplink Collaborative MIMO ===
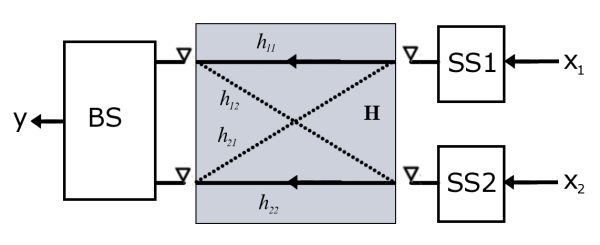
Uplink Collaborative MIMO

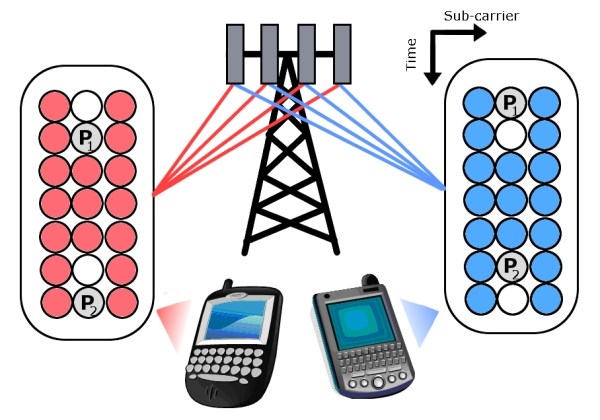
MSs spatially uncorrelated /Without 3dB power penalty

A related technique is called Uplink Collaborative MIMO, where users transmit at the same time in the same frequency. This type of spatial multiplexing improves the sector throughput without requiring multiple transmit antennas at the mobile device. The common non-MIMO method for this in OFDMA is by scheduling different mobile stations at different points in an OFDMA time-frequency map. Collaborative Spatial Multiplexing (Collaborative MIMO) is comparable to regular spatial multiplexing, where multiple data streams are transmitted from multiple antennas on the same device.

=== WiMAX Uplink Collaborative MIMO ===
In the case of WiMAX, Uplink Collaborative MIMO is spatial multiplexing with two different devices, each with one antenna. These transmitting devices are collaborating in the sense that both devices must be synchronized in time and frequency so that the intentional overlapping occurs under controlled circumstances. The two streams of data will then interfere with each other. As long as the signal quality is sufficiently good and the receiver at the base station has at least two antennas, the two data streams can be separated again. This technique is sometimes also termed Virtual Spatial Multiplexing.

== Other MIMO-related radio techniques applied to WiMAX ==
=== Adaptive Antenna Steering (AAS), a.k.a. Beamforming ===
A MIMO-related technique that can be used with WiMAX is called AAS or Beamforming. Multiple antennas and multiple signals are employed, which then shape the beam with the intent of improving transmission to the desired station. The result is reduced interference because the signal going to the desired user is increased and the signal going to other users is reduced.

=== Cyclic Delay Diversity ===
Another MIMO-related technique that can be used in WiMAX systems, but which is outside of the scope of the 802.16 specification, is known as Cyclic Delay Diversity. In this technique, one or more of the signals are delayed before transmission. Because the signals are coming out of two antennas, their receive spectrums differ as each spectrum is characterized by humps and notches due to multi-path fading. At the receiver the signals combine, which improves reception because the joint reception results in shallower spectral humps and fewer spectral notches. The closer the signal can get towards a flat channel at a certain power level, the higher the throughput that can be obtained.

== Radio Conformance Test of WiMAX MIMO ==
The WiMax Forum has a set of standardized conformance test procedures for PHY and MAC specification compliance called the Radio Conformance Test (RCT). Any technology aspect of a particular implementation of a radio interface must first undergo the RCT. Generally, any aspect of the IEEE 802.16 standard that does not have a test procedure in the RCT may be assumed to not yet be widely implemented.

== Silicon implementations of WiMAX MIMO ==
Companies that make RFICs that support WiMAX MIMO include Intel, Beceem , NXP Semiconductors and PMC-Sierra.

== See also ==
- Advanced MIMO communications
- IEEE 802.16
- Integrated Circuit Design
- MIMO
- OFDM
- WiMAX
- Wi-Fi
