= LTE Advanced =

4G mobile communication standard

LTE Advanced logo

LTE Advanced, also named or recognized as LTE+, LTE-A or 4G+, is a 4G mobile cellular communication standard developed by 3GPP as a major enhancement of the Long Term Evolution (LTE) standard.

Three technologies from the LTE-Advanced tool-kit – carrier aggregation, 4x4 MIMO and 256QAM modulation in the downlink – if used together and with sufficient aggregated bandwidth, can deliver maximum peak downlink speeds approaching, or even exceeding, 1 Gbit/s. This is significantly more than the peak 300 Mbit/s rate offered by the preceding LTE standard. Later developments have resulted in LTE Advanced Pro (or 4.9G) which increases bandwidth even further.

LTE Advanced signal indicator in Android

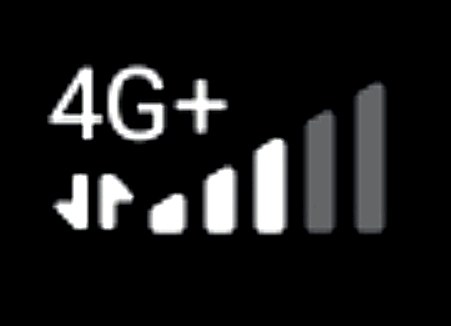
LTE Advanced signal indicator on a Xiaomi smartphone

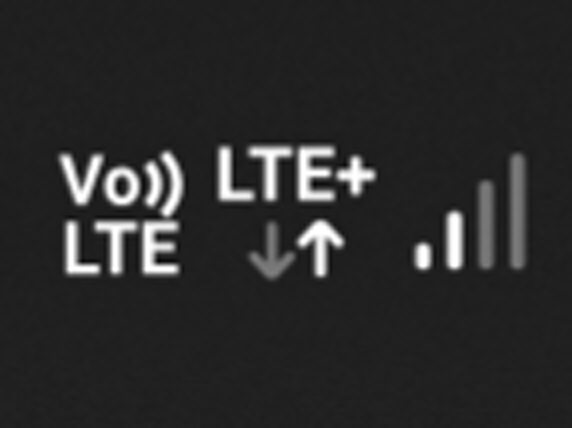
LTE Advanced signal indicator on a Samsung Galaxy smartphone.

LTE Advanced signal indicator on a Samsung Galaxy smartphone and Movistar Chile Carrier.

The first ever LTE Advanced network was deployed in 2013 by SK Telecom in South Korea. In August 2019, the Global mobile Suppliers Association (GSA) reported that there were 304 commercially launched LTE-Advanced networks in 134 countries. Overall, 335 operators are investing in LTE-Advanced (in the form of tests, trials, deployments or commercial service provision) in 141 countries.

== Name ==
LTE Advanced is also named (indicated as) LTE+, LTE-A, or (on Samsung Galaxy and Xiaomi smartphones) as 4G+. Such networks have also often been described as ‘Gigabit LTE networks’ mirroring a term that is also used in the fixed broadband industry.

== History ==
The mobile communication industry and standards organizations have therefore started work on 4G access technologies, such as LTE Advanced. At a workshop in April 2008 in China, 3GPP agreed the plans for work on Long Term Evolution (LTE). A first set of specifications were approved in June 2008. Besides the peak data rate 1 Gb/s as defined by the ITU-R, it also targets faster switching between power states and improved performance at the cell edge. Detailed proposals are being studied within the working groups. The LTE+ format was first proposed by NTT DoCoMo of Japan and has been adopted as the international standard. It was formally submitted as a candidate 4G to ITU-T in late 2009 as meeting the requirements of the IMT-Advanced standard, and was standardized by the 3rd Generation Partnership Project (3GPP) in March 2011 as 3GPP Release 10.

The work by 3GPP to define a 4G candidate radio interface technology started in Release 9 with the study phase for LTE-Advanced. Being described as a 3.9G (beyond 3G but pre-4G), the first release of LTE did not meet the requirements for 4G (also called IMT Advanced as defined by the International Telecommunication Union) such as peak data rates up to 1 Gb/s. The ITU has invited the submission of candidate Radio Interface Technologies (RITs) following their requirements in a circular letter, 3GPP Technical Report (TR) 36.913, "Requirements for Further Advancements for E-UTRA (LTE-Advanced)." These are based on ITU's requirements for 4G and on operators’ own requirements for advanced LTE. Major technical considerations include the following:

- Continual improvement to the LTE radio technology and architecture
- Scenarios and performance requirements for working with legacy radio technologies
- Backward compatibility of LTE-Advanced with LTE. An LTE terminal should be able to work in an LTE-Advanced network and vice versa. Any exceptions will be considered by 3GPP.
- Consideration of recent World Radiocommunication Conference (WRC-07) decisions regarding frequency bands to ensure that LTE-Advanced accommodates the geographically available spectrum for channels above 20 MHz. Also, specifications must recognize those parts of the world in which wideband channels are not available.

Likewise, 'WiMAX 2', 802.16m, has been approved by ITU as the IMT Advanced family. WiMAX 2 is designed to be backward compatible with WiMAX 1 devices. Most vendors now support conversion of 'pre-4G', pre-advanced versions and some support software upgrades of base station equipment from 3G.

== Proposals ==
Cellular network standards and generation timeline.

The target of 3GPP LTE Advanced is to reach and surpass the ITU requirements. LTE Advanced should be compatible with first release LTE equipment, and should share frequency bands with first release LTE. In the feasibility study for LTE Advanced, 3GPP determined that LTE Advanced would meet the ITU-R requirements for 4G. The results of the study are published in 3GPP Technical Report (TR) 36.912.

LTE Advanced includes support for advanced network topologies, enabling heterogeneous networks that combine traditional macrocells with lower-power nodes such as picocells, femtocells, and relay nodes. This architecture is designed to improve network capacity, extend coverage, and enhance service quality by bringing network access points closer to users. LTE Advanced also supports carrier aggregation, allowing multiple frequency bands to be combined into an effective bandwidth of up to 100MHz, which enables higher peak data rates and more efficient spectrum utilization.

In the research phase many proposals have been studied as candidates for LTE Advanced (LTE-A) technologies. The proposals could roughly be categorized into:

- Support for relay node base stations
- Coordinated multipoint (CoMP) transmission and reception
- UE Dual TX antenna solutions for SU-MIMO and diversity MIMO, commonly referred to as 2x2 MIMO
- Scalable system bandwidth exceeding 20 MHz, up to 100 MHz
- Carrier aggregation of contiguous and non-contiguous spectrum allocations
- Local area optimization of air interface
- Nomadic / Local Area network and mobility solutions
- Flexible spectrum usage
- Cognitive radio
- Automatic and autonomous network configuration and operation
- Support of autonomous network and device test, measurement tied to network management and optimization
- Enhanced precoding and forward error correction
- Interference management and suppression
- Asymmetric bandwidth assignment for FDD
- Hybrid OFDMA and SC-FDMA in uplink
- UL/DL inter eNB coordinated MIMO
- SONs, Self Organizing Networks methodologies

Within the range of system development, LTE-Advanced and WiMAX 2 can use up to 8x8 MIMO and 128-QAM in downlink direction. Example performance: 100 MHz aggregated bandwidth, LTE-Advanced provides almost 3.3 Gbit peak download rates per sector of the base station under ideal conditions. Advanced network architectures combined with distributed and collaborative smart antenna technologies provide several years road map of commercial enhancements.

The 3GPP standards Release 12 added support for 256-QAM.

A summary of a study carried out in 3GPP can be found in TR36.912.

== Timeframe and introduction of additional features ==
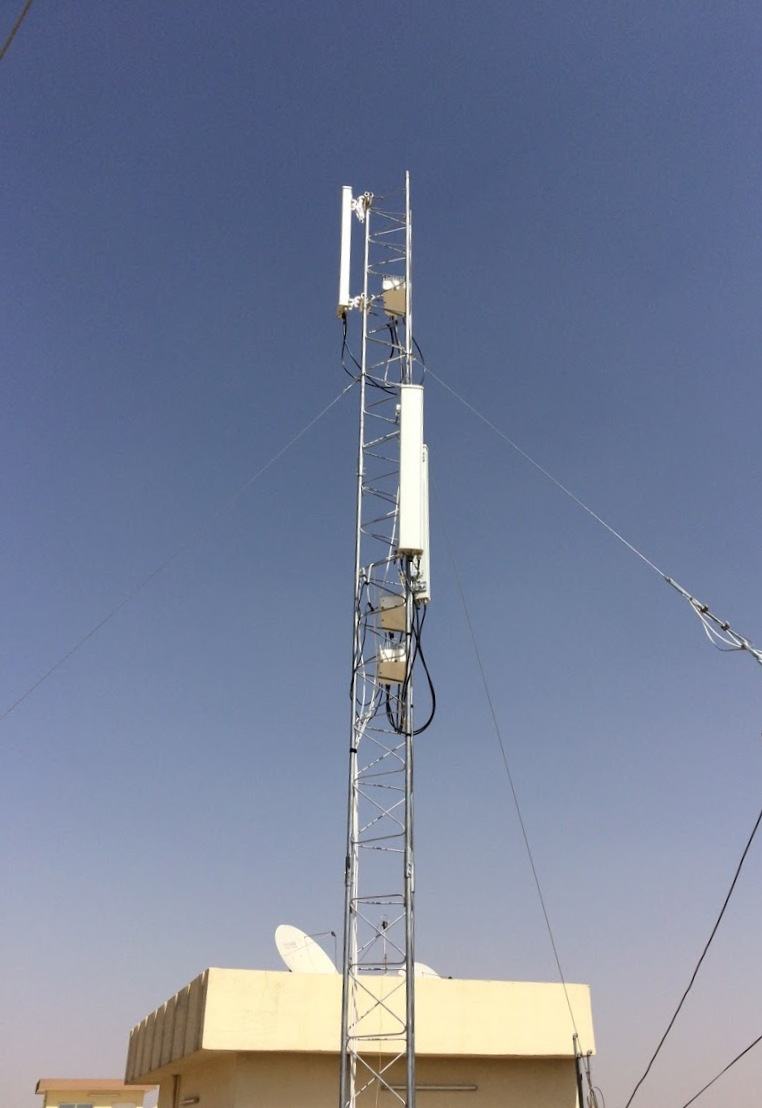
An LTE Advanced base station installed in Iraq for provisioning of broadband wireless Internet service

Original standardization work for LTE-Advanced was done as part of 3GPP Release 10, which was frozen in April 2011. Trials were based on pre-release equipment. Major vendors support software upgrades to later versions and ongoing improvements.

In order to improve the quality of service for users in hotspots and on cell edges, heterogeneous networks (HetNets) are formed of a mixture of macro-, pico- and femto base stations serving corresponding-size areas. Frozen in December 2012, 3GPP Release 11 concentrates on better support of HetNet. Coordinated Multi-Point operation (CoMP) is a key feature of Release 11 in order to support such network structures. Whereas users located at a cell edge in homogenous networks suffer from decreasing signal strength compounded by neighbor cell interference, CoMP is designed to enable use of a neighboring cell to also transmit the same signal as the serving cell, enhancing quality of service on the perimeter of a serving cell. In-device Co-existence (IDC) is another topic addressed in Release 11. IDC features are designed to ameliorate disturbances within the user equipment caused between LTE/LTE-A and the various other radio subsystems such as WiFi, Bluetooth, and the GPS receiver. Further enhancements for MIMO such as 4x4 configuration for the uplink were standardized.

The higher number of cells in HetNet results in user equipment changing the serving cell more frequently when in motion. The ongoing work on LTE-Advanced in Release 12, amongst other areas, concentrates on addressing issues that come about when users move through HetNet, such as frequent hand-overs between cells. It also included use of 256-QAM.

== First technology demonstrations and field trials ==
This list covers technology demonstrations and field trials up to the year 2014, paving the way for a wider commercial deployment of the VoLTE technology worldwide. From 2014 onwards various further operators trialled and demonstrated the technology for future deployment on their respective networks. These are not covered here. Instead a coverage of commercial deployments can be found in the section below.

Company	Country	Date	Note
NTT DoCoMo	Japan	February 2007	The operator announced the completion of a 4G trial where it achieved a maximum packet transmission rate of approximately 5 Gbit/s in the downlink using 12 transmit and 12 receive antennas and 100 MHz frequency bandwidth to a mobile station moving at 10 km/h.
Agilent Technologies	Spain	February 2011	The vendor demonstrated at Mobile World Congress the industry's first test solutions for LTE-Advanced with both signal generation and signal analysis solutions.
Ericsson	Sweden	June 2011	The vendor demonstrated LTE-Advanced in Kista.
touch	Lebanon	April 2013	The operator trialed LTE-Advanced with Chinese vendor Huawei and combined 800 MHz spectrum and 1.8 GHz spectrum. touch achieved 250 Mbit/s.
Vodafone	New Zealand	May 2013	The operator trialed LTE-Advanced with Nokia Networks and combined 1.8 GHz spectrum and 700 MHz spectrum. Vodafone achieved just below 300 Mbit/s.
A1	Austria	June 2013	The operator trialed LTE-Advanced with Ericsson and NSN using 4x4 MIMO. A1 achieved 580 Mbit/s.
Turkcell	Turkey	August 2013	The operator trialed LTE-Advanced in Istanbul with Chinese vendor Huawei. Turkcell achieved 900 Mbit/s.
Telstra	Australia	August 2013	The operator trialed LTE-Advanced with Swedish vendor Ericsson and combined 900 MHz spectrum and 1.8 GHz spectrum.
SMART	Philippines	August 2013	The operator trialed LTE-Advanced with Chinese vendor Huawei and combined 2.1 GHz spectrum and 1.80 GHz spectrum bands and achieved 200 Mbit/s.
SoftBank	Japan	September 2013	The operator trialed LTE-Advanced in Tokyo with Chinese vendor Huawei. Softbank used the 3.5 GHz spectrum band and achieved 770 Mbit/s.
beCloud/ MTS	Belarus	October 2013	The operator trialed LTE-Advanced with Chinese vendor Huawei.
SFR	France	October 2013	The operator trialed LTE-Advanced in Marseille and combined 800 MHz spectrum and 2.6 GHz spectrum. SFR achieved 174 Mbit/s.
EE	United Kingdom	November 2013	The operator trialed LTE-Advanced in London with Chinese vendor Huawei and combined 20 MHz of 1.8 GHz spectrum and 20 MHz of 2.6 GHz spectrum. EE achieved 300 Mbit/s which is equal to category 6 LTE.
O_{2}	Germany	November 2013	The operator trialed LTE-Advanced in Munich with Chinese vendor Huawei and combined 10 MHz of 800 MHz spectrum and 20 MHz of 2.6 GHz spectrum. O_{2} achieved 225 Mbit/s.
SK Telecom	South Korea	November 2013	The operator trialed LTE-Advanced and combined 10 MHz of 850 MHz spectrum and 20 MHz of 1.8 GHz spectrum. SK Telecom achieved 225 Mbit/s.
Vodafone	Germany	November 2013	The operator trialed LTE-Advanced in Dresden with Swedish vendor Ericsson and combined 10 MHz of 800 MHz spectrum and 20 MHz of 2.6 GHz spectrum. Vodafone achieved 225 Mbit/s.
Telstra	Australia	December 2013	The operator trialed LTE-Advanced with Swedish vendor Ericsson and combined 20 MHz of 1.8 GHz spectrum and 20 MHz of 2.6 GHz spectrum. Telstra achieved 300 Mbit/s which is equal to category 6 LTE.
Optus	Australia	December 2013	The operator trialed TD-LTE-Advanced with Chinese vendor Huawei and combined two 20 MHz channels of 2.3 GHz spectrum. Optus achieved over 160 Mbit/s.
Entel Chile	Chile	September 2015	The operator trialed LTE-Advanced in Rancagua using 15 MHz of 700 MHz and 20 MHz of 2600 MHz spectrum, achieving over 200 Mbit/s.
Claro Brasil	Brazil	December 2015	The Claro Brasil presented in Rio Verde the first tests with 4.5G technology, LTE Advanced, which offers an internet speed of up to 300 Mbit/s.
AIS	Thailand	March 2016	The operator launched the first 4.5G on LTE-U/LAA network in Bangkok with the combination of 1800 MHz spectrum and 2100 MHz spectrum using Carrier Aggregation (CA), 4x4 MIMO, DL256QAM/UL64QAM and the use of LTE-Unlicensed (LTE-U) to facilitate high-speed network. AIS achieved download speed up to 784.5 Mbit/s and upload speed 495 Mbit/s. This was made possible by Joint Development Center (JIC) the special R&D program between AIS and Huawei.
MagtiCom	Georgia	May 2016	The operator trialed LTE-Advanced in Tbilisi and combined the 800 MHz with its existing 1800 MHz spectrum. MagtiCom achieved download speed 185 Mbit/s and upload speed 75 Mbit/s.
Ucom	Armenia	September 2016	The operator trialed LTE-Advanced with Swedish vendor Ericsson. Ucom achieved 250 Mbit/s download speed which is equal to category 6 LTE.
Altel	Kazakhstan	April 2017	The operator launched LTE-Advanced in 12 cities across Kazakhstan. Altel achieved 225 Mbit/s download speed. LTE-Advanced (4G+) Technology is up to be launched in 5 more cities in Kazakhstan in May 2017.
Bite Latvija	Latvia	September 2016	The operator launched 8 4.5G cell stations in Riga after testing in partnership with Huawei and the Riga Technical University on June 15, 2017.
Wi-Tribe	Pakistan	May 2017	The operator first tested their LTE-A network in May 2017 over the 3.5 GHz band, and it was then made officially available in Lahore, Pakistan, with more cities to follow. Wi-Tribe achieved speeds of up to 200 Mbit/s over their new LTE-A network. This was done using equipment from Huawei.
Telcel	Mexico	March 2018	The operator offered the service in Mexico City and other 10 cities nationwide on March 14, 2018.
Airtel	India	April 2012	On 10 April 2012, Airtel launched 4G services through dongles and modems using TD-LTE technology in Kolkata, becoming the first company in India to offer 4G services. The Kolkata launch was followed by launches in Bangalore (7 May 2012), Pune (18 October 2012), and Chandigarh, Mohali and Panchkula (25 March 2013).

== LTE Advanced Pro ==
LTE Advanced Pro logo

LTE Advanced Pro (LTE-A Pro, also known as 4.5G, 4.5G Pro, 4.9G, Pre-5G, 5G Project) is a name for 3GPP release 13 and 14. It is an evolution of LTE Advanced (LTE-A) cellular standard supporting data rates in excess of 3 Gbit/s using 32-carrier aggregation. It also introduces the concept of License Assisted Access, which allows sharing of licensed and unlicensed spectrum.

Additionally, it incorporates several new technologies associated with 5G, such as 256-QAM, Massive MIMO, LTE-Unlicensed and LTE IoT, that facilitated early migration of existing networks to enhancements promised with the full 5G standard.

Telstra in Australia deployed the very first LTE Advanced Pro network in January 2017.

Following AT&T's rollout of LTE Advanced and Advanced Pro networks in 2017, it inaccurately referred to them as "5G Evolution" (5G E) in advertising and on-device network indicators.

== See also ==
- 5G NR (5G New Radio)
- E-UTRA
- LTE User Equipment Category
- Simulation of LTE Networks

== Bibliography ==
- Qualcomm

LTE for UMTS - OFDMA and SC-FDMA Based Radio Access, ISBN 978-0-470-99401-6 Chapter 2.6: LTE Advanced for IMT-advanced, pp. 19–21.

- e,:-(editor), LTE and the Evolution to 4G Wireless: Design and Measurement Challenges, Agilent Technologies Publication 2009, ISBN 978-0-470-68261-6, Chapter 8.7: Proving LTE Advanced, p. 425.
- , et al.; Nokia Siemens Networks; LTE Advanced: The Path towards Gigabit/s in Wireless Mobile Communications, Wireless VITAE'09.
- Mobile Terminal Receiver Design: LTE and LTE-Advanced , ISBN 9781119107309.
