= Multi-carrier code-division multiple access =

Multiple access scheme in telecommunications

Multi-carrier code-division multiple access (MC-CDMA) is a multiple access scheme used in OFDM-based telecommunication systems, allowing the system to support multiple users at the same time over same frequency band.

MC-CDMA spreads each user symbol in the frequency domain. That is, each user symbol is carried over multiple parallel subcarriers, but it is phase-shifted (typically 0 or 180 degrees) according to a code value. The code values differ per subcarrier and per user. The receiver combines all subcarrier signals, by weighing these to compensate varying signal strengths and undo the code shift. The receiver can separate signals of different users, because these have different (e.g. orthogonal) code values.

Since each data symbol occupies a much wider bandwidth (in hertz) than the data rate (in bit/s), a ratio of signal to noise-plus-interference (if defined as signal power divided by total noise plus interference power in the entire transmission band) of less than 0 dB is feasible.

One way of interpreting MC-CDMA is to regard it as a direct-sequence CDMA signal (DS-CDMA), which is transmitted after it has been fed through an inverse FFT (fast Fourier transform).

== Rationale ==
Wireless radio links suffer from frequency-selective channel interference. If the signal on one subcarrier experiences an outage, it can still be reconstructed from the energy received over other subcarriers.

== Downlink: MC-CDM ==
In the downlink (one base station transmitting to one or more terminals), MC-CDMA typically reduces to Multi-Carrier Code Division Multiplexing. All user signals can easily be synchronized, and all signals on one subcarrier experience the same radio channel properties. In such case a preferred system implementation is to take N user bits (possibly but not necessarily for different destinations), to transform these using a Walsh Hadamard transform, followed by an IFFT.

== Variants ==
A number of alternative possibilities exist as to how this frequency domain spreading can take place, such as by using a long PN code and multiplying each data symbol, d_{i}, on a subcarrier by a chip from the PN code, c_{i}, or by using short PN codes and spreading each data symbol by an individual PN code — i.e. d_{i} is multiplied by each c_{i} and the resulting vector is placed on N_{freq} subcarriers, where N_{freq} is the PN code length.

Once frequency domain spreading has taken place and the OFDM subcarriers have all been allocated values, OFDM modulation then takes place using the IFFT to produce an OFDM symbol; the OFDM guard interval is then added; and if transmission is in the downlink direction each of these resulting symbols are added together prior to transmission.

An alternative form of multi-carrier CDMA, called MC-DS-CDMA or MC/DS-CDMA, performs spreading in the time domain, rather than in the frequency domain in the case of MC-CDMA — for the special case where there is only one carrier, this reverts to standard DS-CDMA.

For the case of MC-DS-CDMA where OFDM is used as the modulation scheme, the data symbols on the individual subcarriers are spread in time by multiplying the chips on a PN code by the data symbol on the subcarrier. For example, assume the PN code chips consist of {1, −1} and the data symbol on the subcarrier is −j. The symbol being modulated onto that carrier, for symbols 0 and 1, will be −j for symbol 0 and +j for symbol 1.

2-dimensional spreading in both the frequency and time domains is also possible, and a scheme that uses 2-D spreading is VSF-OFCDM (which stands for variable spreading factor orthogonal frequency code-division multiplexing), which NTT DoCoMo is using for its 4G prototype system.

As an example of how the 2D spreading on VSF-OFCDM works, if you take the first data symbol, d_{0}, and a spreading factor in the time domain, SF_{time}, of length 4, and a spreading factor in the frequency domain, SF_{frequency} of 2, then the data symbol, d_{0}, will be multiplied by the length-2 frequency-domain PN codes and placed on subcarriers 0 and 1, and these values on subcarriers 0 and 1 will then be multiplied by the length-4 time-domain PN code and transmitted on OFDM symbols 0, 1, 2 and 3.

NTT DoCoMo has already achieved 5 Gbit/s transmissions to receivers travelling at 10 km/h using its 4G prototype system in a 100 MHz-wide channel. This 4G prototype system also uses a 12×12 antenna MIMO configuration, and turbo coding for error correction coding.

Summary

1. OFDMA with frequency spreading (MC-CDMA)
2. OFDMA with time spreading (MC-DS-CDMA and MT-CDMA)
3. OFDMA with both time and frequency spreading (Orthogonal Frequency Code Division Multiple Access(OFCDMA))

== See also ==
- OFDMA, an alternative multiple access scheme for OFDM systems, where the signals of different users are separated in the frequency domain by allocating different sub-carriers to different users.

== Literature ==
- N. Yee, J.P.M.G. Linnartz and G. Fettweis, "Multi-Carrier CDMA in indoor wireless Radio Networks", IEEE Personal Indoor and Mobile Radio Communications (PIMRC) Int. Conference, Sept. 1993, Yokohama, Japan, pp. 109–113 (1993: first paper proposing the system and the name MC-CDMA)
- K. Fazel and L. Papke, "On the performance of convolutionally-coded CDMA/OFDM for mobile communication system", IEEE Personal Indoor and Mobile Radio Communications (PIMRC) Int. Conference, Sept. 1993, Yokohama, Japan, pp. 468–472
- A. Chouly, A. Brajal, and S. Jourdan, "Orthogonal multicarrier techniques applied to direct sequence spread spectrum CDMA systems," in Proceedings of Global Telecommunications Conference (GLOBECOM'93), pp. 1723–1728, Houston, Tex, USA, November 1993.
- N.Yee, J.P.M.G. Linnartz and G. Fettweis, "Multi-Carrier-CDMA in indoor wireless networks", IEICE Transaction on Communications, Japan, Vol. E77-B, No. 7, July 1994, pp. 900–904.
- J.P.M.G. Linnartz, "Performance Analysis of Synchronous MC-CDMA in mobile Rayleigh channels with both Delay and Doppler spreads", IEEE VT, Vol. 50, No. 6, Nov. 2001, pp 1375–1387. PDF
- K. Fazel and S. Kaiser, Multi-Carrier and Spread Spectrum Systems: From OFDM and MC-CDMA to LTE and WiMAX, 2nd Edition, John Wiley & Sons, 2008, ISBN 978-0-470-99821-2.
- Hughes Software Systems, Multi Carrier Code Division Multiple Access, March 2002.
- German Aerospace Center, Institute of Communications and Navigation, History of Multi-Carrier Code Division Multiple Access (MC-CDMA) and Multi-Carrier Spread Spectrum Workshop, November 2006.
- Wireless Communication Reference Web Site, section about MC-CDMA, 2001.
