= List of WiMAX networks =

The following is a list of WiMAX networks.

== Standards ==
- IEEE 802.16 - called fixed WiMAX because of static connection without handover.
- IEEE 802.16e - called mobile WiMAX because it allows handovers between base stations.
- IEEE 802.16m - advanced air interface with data rates of 100 Mbit/s mobile and 1 Gbit/s fixed.

== Networks ==
Operator	Country	Frequency (GHz)	Standard	Launch date	Notes
YooMee	Cameroon	2,5	IEEE 802.16e	May 2011	Network is upgradable to LTE, if it should be necessary.
Mobitel	Nigeria	2,3	IEEE 802.16e	November 2010	
uMax	Zimbabwe	2,5	IEEE 802.16e	June 2012	
Digicel	Cayman Islands	2,3	IEEE 802.16e	December 2005	
Claro	Chile	3,5	IEEE 802.16; IEEE 802.16e	March 2007; October 2007	
BigAir	Australia	5,8	IEEE 802.16m	August 2007	Operates near-blanket coverage across Sydney, Melbourne, Brisbane, Gold Coast, Adelaide and Perth. This network provides Australian businesses with symmetric broadband services.
PT First Media	Indonesia	2,3	IEEE 802.16	July 2010	
UQ Communications (KDDI)	Japan	2,5	IEEE 802.16e	February 2009	
Ulusnet	Mongolia	3,5	IEEE 802.16; IEEE 802.16e	February 2007; March 2011	
Bollore Telecom	France	3,5	IEEE 802.16e	?	

== See also ==
- List of LTE networks
