= IEEE 802.16 =

Series of wireless broadband standards

- Working Group on Broadband Wireless Access Standards

IEEE 802.16 is a series of wireless broadband standards written by the Institute of Electrical and Electronics Engineers (IEEE). The IEEE Standards Board established a working group in 1999 to develop standards for broadband for Wireless metropolitan area networks. The Workgroup is a unit of the IEEE 802 local area network and metropolitan area network standards committee.

Although the 802.16 family of standards is officially called WirelessMAN in IEEE, it has been commercialized under the name "WiMAX" (from "Worldwide Interoperability for Microwave Access") by the WiMAX Forum industry alliance. The Forum promotes and certifies compatibility and interoperability of products based on the IEEE 802.16 standards.

The 802.16e-2005 amendment was implemented and deployed around the world as of 2009. The version IEEE 802.16-2009 was amended by IEEE 802.16j-2009.

== Standards ==
Projects publish draft and proposed standards with the letter "P" prefixed. Once a standard is ratified and published, that "P" gets dropped and replaced by a trailing dash and suffix year of publication.

=== Projects ===
Standard	Description	Status
802.16	Fixed Broadband Wireless Access (10–66 GHz)	Superseded
802.16.2	Recommended practice for coexistence	Superseded
802.16c	System profiles for 10–66 GHz	Superseded
802.16a	Physical layer and MAC definitions for 2–10 GHz	Superseded
P802.16b	License-exempt frequencies (Project withdrawn)	Withdrawn
P802.16d	Maintenance and System profiles for 2–11 GHz (Project merged into 802.16-2004)	Merged
802.16	Air Interface for Fixed Broadband Wireless Access System (rollup of 802.16–2001, 802.16a, 802.16c and P802.16d)	Superseded
P802.16.2a	Coexistence with 2–11 GHz and 23.5–43.5 GHz (Project merged into 802.16.2-2004)	Merged
802.16.2	IEEE Recommended Practice for Local and metropolitan area networks Coexistence of Fixed Broadband Wireless Access Systems (Maintenance and rollup of 802.16.2–2001 and P802.16.2a); Released on 2004-March-17.	Existing
802.16f	Management Information Base (MIB) for 802.16-2004	Superseded
802.16-2004/Cor 1–2005	Corrections for fixed operations (co-published with 802.16e-2005)	Superseded
802.16e	Mobile Broadband Wireless Access System	Superseded
802.16k	IEEE Standard for Local and Metropolitan Area Networks: Media Access Control (MAC) Bridges; Amendment 2: Bridging of IEEE 802.16 (An amendment to IEEE 802.1D); Released on 2007-August-14.	Existing
802.16g	Management Plane Procedures and Services	Superseded
P802.16i	Mobile Management Information Base (Project merged into 802.16-2009)	Merged
802.16-2009	Air Interface for Fixed and Mobile Broadband Wireless Access System (rollup of 802.16–2004, 802.16-2004/Cor 1, 802.16e, 802.16f, 802.16g and P802.16i)	Superseded
802.16j	Multihop relay	Superseded
802.16h	Improved Coexistence Mechanisms for License-Exempt Operation	Superseded
802.16m	Advanced Air Interface with data rates of 100 Mbit/s mobile and 1 Gbit/s fixed. Also known as Mobile WiMAX Release 2 or WirelessMAN-Advanced. Aiming at fulfilling the ITU-R IMT-Advanced requirements on 4G systems.	Superseded
802.16-2012	IEEE Standard for Air Interface for Broadband Wireless Access Systems; It is a rollup of 802.16h, 802.16j and Std 802.16m (but excluding the WirelessMAN-Advanced radio interface, which was moved to IEEE Std 802.16.1). Released on 2012-August-17.	Superseded
802.16.1	IEEE Standard for WirelessMAN-Advanced Air Interface for Broadband Wireless Access Systems; Released on 2012-September-07.	Existing
802.16p	IEEE Standard for Air Interface for Broadband Wireless Access Systems; Amendment 1: Enhancements to Support Machine-to-Machine Applications; Released on 2012-October-08.	Existing
802.16.1b	IEEE Standard for WirelessMAN-Advanced Air Interface for Broadband Wireless Access Systems; Amendment 1: Enhancements to Support Machine-to-Machine Applications; Released on 2012-October-10.	Existing
802.16n	IEEE Standard for Air Interface for Broadband Wireless Access Systems; Amendment 2: Higher Reliability Networks; Approved on 2013-March-06.	Existing
802.16.1a	IEEE Standard for WirelessMAN-Advanced Air Interface for Broadband Wireless Access Systems; Amendment 2: Higher Reliability Networks; Approved on 2013-March-06.	Existing
802.16-2017	IEEE Standard for Air Interface for Broadband Wireless Access Systems; It is a rollup of 802.16p, 802.16n, 802.16q (Multi-tier Networks) and Std 802.16s (licensed spectrum, bandwidth 0.1–1.25 MHz); Released on 2017-September.	Existing
802.16t	Amendment - Fixed and Mobile Wireless Access in Narrowband Channels, a new PHY for licensed spectrum operation with bandwidths of 5–100 kHz. Approved 2020-12-03.	Existing

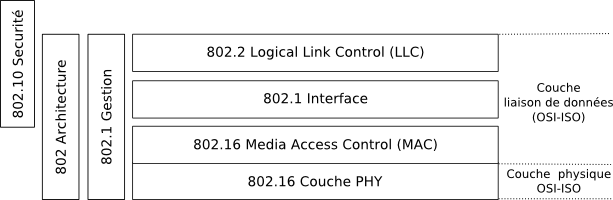

== 802.16e-2005 technology ==
The 802.16 standard essentially standardizes two aspects of the air interface – the physical layer (PHY) and the media access control (MAC) layer. This section provides an overview of the technology employed in these two layers in the mobile 802.16e specification.

=== PHY ===
802.16e uses scalable orthogonal frequency-division multiple access (OFDMA) to carry data, supporting channel bandwidths of between 1.25 MHz and 20 MHz, with up to 2048 subcarriers. It supports adaptive modulation and coding, so that in conditions of good signal, a highly efficient 64 QAM (Quadrature amplitude modulation) coding scheme is used, whereas when the signal is poorer, a more robust binary phase-shift keying (BPSK) coding mechanism is used. In intermediate conditions, 16 QAM and QPSK can also be employed. Other PHY features include support for multiple-input multiple-output (MIMO) antennas in order to provide good non-line-of-sight propagation (NLOS) characteristics (or higher bandwidth) and hybrid automatic repeat request (HARQ) for good error correction performance.

Although the standards allow operation in any band from 2 to 66 GHz, mobile operation is best in the lower bands which are also the most crowded, and therefore most expensive.

=== MAC ===
The 802.16 MAC describes a number of convergence sublayers which describe how wireline technologies such as Ethernet, Asynchronous Transfer Mode (ATM) and Internet Protocol (IP) are encapsulated on the air interface, and how data is classified, etc. It also describes how secure communications are delivered, by using secure key exchange during authentication, and encryption using Advanced Encryption Standard (AES) or Data Encryption Standard (DES) during data transfer. Further features of the MAC layer include power saving mechanisms (using sleep mode and idle mode) and handover mechanisms.

A key feature of 802.16 is that it is a connection-oriented technology. The subscriber station (SS) cannot transmit data until it has been allocated a channel by the base station (BS). This allows 802.16e to provide strong support for quality of service (QoS).

==== QoS ====
Quality of service (QoS) in 802.16e is supported by allocating each connection between the SS and the BS (called a service flow in 802.16 terminology) to a specific QoS class. In 802.16e, there are five QoS classes:

802.16e-2005 QoS classes
Service	Abbrev.	Definition	Typical applications
Unsolicited Grant Service	UGS	Real-time data streams comprising fixed-size data packets issued at periodic intervals	T1/E1 transport
Extended Real-time Polling Service	ertPS	Real-time service flows that generate variable-sized data packets on a periodic basis	VoIP
Real-time Polling Service	rtPS	Real-time data streams comprising variable-sized data packets that are issued at periodic intervals	MPEG Video
Non-real-time Polling Service	nrtPS	Delay-tolerant data streams comprising variable-sized data packets for which a minimum data rate is required	FTP with guaranteed minimum throughput
Best Effort	BE	Data streams for which no minimum service level is required and therefore may be handled on a space-available basis	HTTP

The BS and the SS use a service flow with an appropriate QoS class (plus other parameters, such as bandwidth and delay) to ensure that application data receives QoS treatment appropriate to the application.

== Certification ==
Because the IEEE only sets specifications but does not test equipment for compliance with them, the WiMAX Forum runs a certification program wherein members pay for certification. WiMAX certification by this group is intended to guarantee compliance with the standard and interoperability with equipment from other manufacturers. The mission of the Forum is to promote and certify compatibility and interoperability of broadband wireless products.

== See also ==
- WiBro
- WiMAX
- WiBAS
- WiMAX MIMO
- Wireless mesh network
- 4G LTE
