= HTC Max 4G =

Smartphone model

The HTC MAX 4G was the world's first commercial WiMAX phone announced on the HTC website in a November 12, 2008 press release. It is based on Windows Mobile 6.1. The phone is developed by the High Tech Computer Corporation of Taiwan and is similar in looks to previously released HTC Touch HD. It is the first phone from the HTC Touch Family to incorporate GSM & WiMAX technology. The phone was only offered for the Russian market, specifically for the Yota network which was operated in Moscow, St. Petersburg, Ufa, Sochi and Krasnodar. The phone was expected to be released in April 2009 in the UK.

The phone uses a widescreen WVGA 480x800 display and is marketed as an entertainment phone. It is also capable of VoIP communication over the WiMAX network.

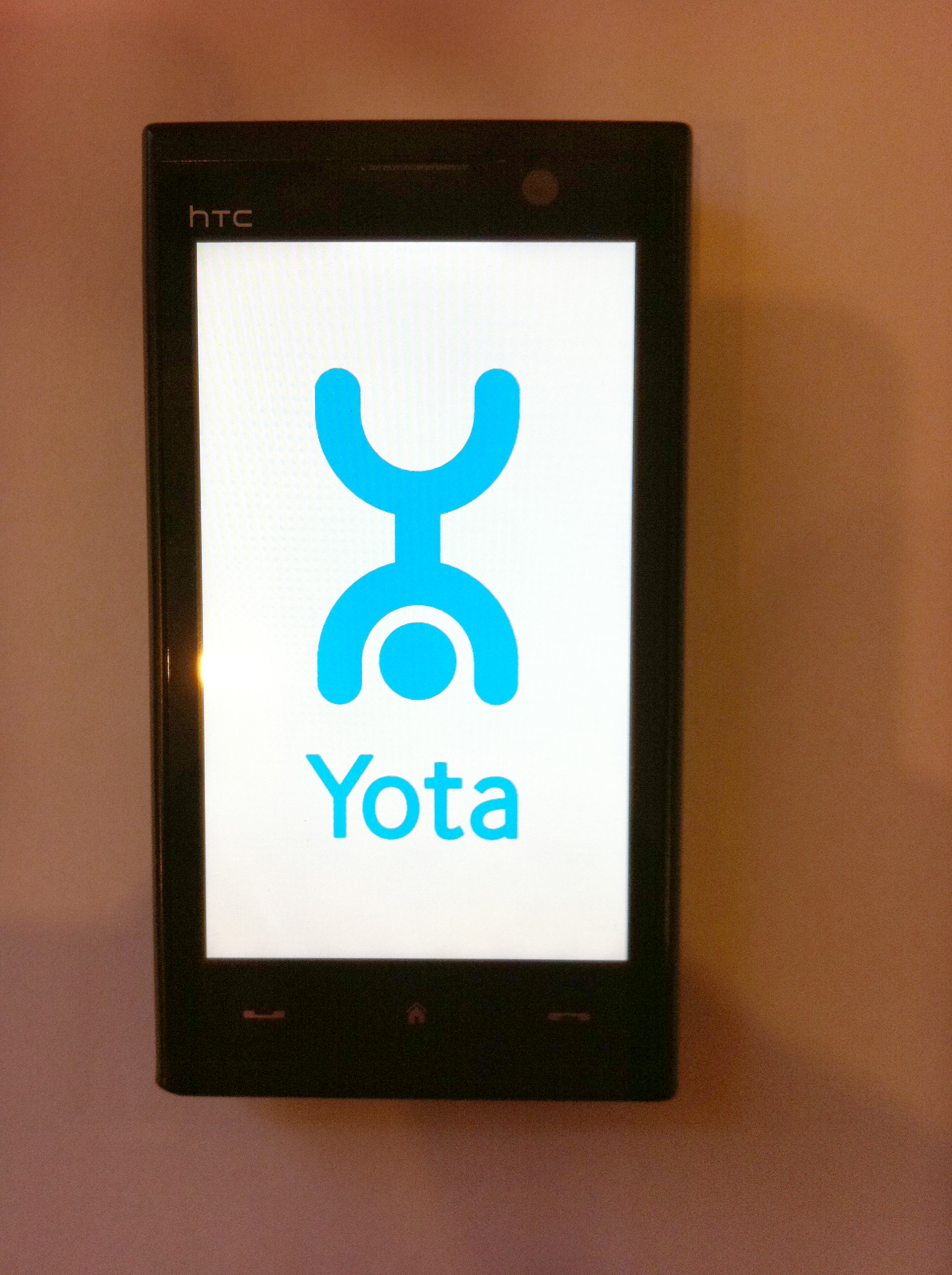
HTC MAX 4G

== Specifications ==
Item	Detail
Processor	Qualcomm ESM7206A, 528 MHz
Operating System	Windows Mobile 6.1 Professional
Memory	ROM: 256MB, RAM: 288MB, Flash: 8GB
Dimensions	113.5 mm (L) X 63.1 mm (W) X 13.9 mm (T)
Weight	151 g (with battery)
Display	3.8-inch TFT-LCD flat touch-sensitive screen with WVGA (480 X 800) resolution
Network	Mobile WiMAX: IEEE 802.16e (2.5 ~ 2.7 GHz), Tri-band GSM/GPRS/EDGE: 900/1800/1900 MHz
Connectivity	Wi-Fi: IEEE 802.11 b/g, Bluetooth 2.0 with Enhanced Data Rate and A2DP for stereo wireless headsets
Special Features	Video over IP

== Price ==
Recommended retail price was 25900 rubles (about 816 US dollars or €580 (based on the exchange rate at that time)), according to Yota's official website
