= WiMAX =

Wireless broadband standard

WiMAX Forum logo

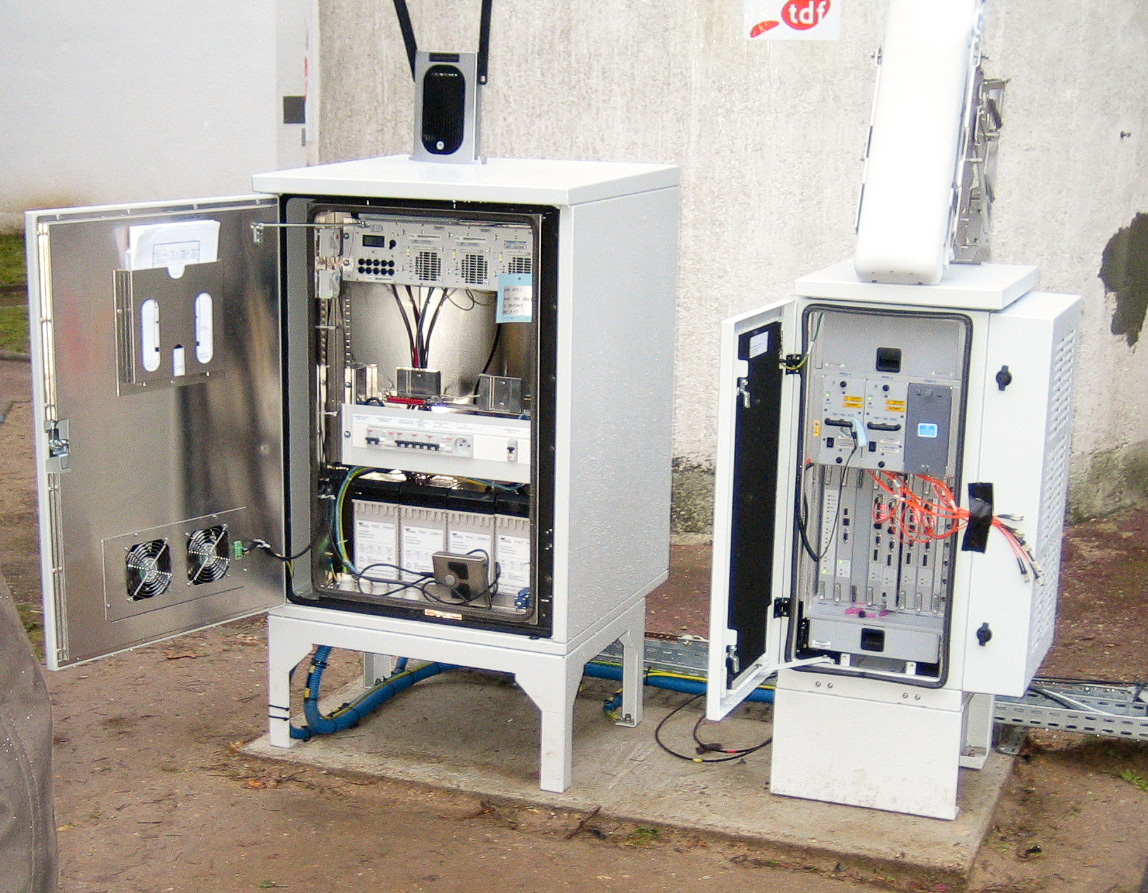
WiMAX base station equipment with a sector antenna and wireless modem on top

Worldwide Interoperability for Microwave Access (WiMAX) is a family of wireless broadband communication standards based on the IEEE 802.16 set of standards, which provide physical layer (PHY) and media access control (MAC) options.

The WiMAX Forum was formed in June 2001 to promote conformity and interoperability, including the definition of system profiles for commercial vendors. The forum describes WiMAX as "a standards-based technology enabling the delivery of last mile wireless broadband access as an alternative to cable and DSL".

WiMAX was initially designed to provide 30 to 40 Mbit/s data rates, with the 2011 update providing up to 1 Gbit/s for fixed stations. IEEE 802.16m or Wireless MAN-Advanced was a candidate for 4G, in competition with the LTE Advanced standard. WiMAX release 2.1, popularly branded as WiMAX 2+, is a backwards-compatible transition from previous WiMAX generations. It is compatible and interoperable with TD-LTE. Newer versions, still backward compatible, include WiMAX release 2.2 (2014) and WiMAX release 3 (2021, adds interoperation with 5G NR).

== Terminology ==
WiMAX refers to interoperable implementations of the IEEE 802.16 family of wireless-networks standards ratified by the WiMAX Forum. (Similarly, Wi-Fi refers to interoperable implementations of the IEEE 802.11 Wireless LAN standards certified by the Wi-Fi Alliance.) WiMAX Forum certification allows vendors to sell fixed or mobile products as WiMAX certified, thus ensuring a level of interoperability with other certified products, as long as they fit the same profile.

The original IEEE 802.16 standard (now called "Fixed WiMAX") was published in 2001. WiMAX adopted some of its technology from WiBro, a service marketed in Korea.

Mobile WiMAX (originally based on 802.16e-2005) is the revision that was deployed in many countries and is the basis for future revisions such as 802.16m-2011.

WiMAX was sometimes referred to as "Wi-Fi on steroids" and can be used for a number of applications including broadband connections, cellular backhaul, hotspots, etc. It is similar to Long-range Wi-Fi, but it can enable usage at much greater distances.

== Uses of WiMAX ==
The scalable physical layer architecture that allows for data rate to scale easily with available channel bandwidth and range of WiMAX make it suitable for the following potential applications:

- Providing portable mobile broadband connectivity across cities and countries through various devices.
- Providing a wireless alternative to cable and digital subscriber line (DSL) for "last mile" broadband access.
- Providing data, telecommunications (VoIP) and IPTV services (triple play).
- Providing Internet connectivity as part of a business continuity plan.
- Smart grids and metering.

=== Internet access ===
WiMAX can provide at-home or mobile Internet access across whole cities or countries. In many cases, this has resulted in competition in markets which typically only had access through an existing incumbent DSL (or similar) operator.

Additionally, given the relatively low costs associated with the deployment of a WiMAX network (in comparison with 3G, HSDPA, xDSL, HFC or FTTx), it is now economically viable to provide last-mile broadband Internet access in remote locations.

=== Middle-mile backhaul to fiber networks ===
Mobile WiMAX was a replacement candidate for cellular phone technologies such as GSM and CDMA, or can be used as an overlay to increase capacity. Fixed WiMAX is also considered as a wireless backhaul technology for 2G, 3G, and 4G networks in both developed and developing nations.

In North America, backhaul for urban operations is typically provided via one or more copper wire line connections, whereas remote cellular operations are sometimes backhauled via satellite. In other regions, urban and rural backhaul is usually provided by microwave links. (The exception to this is where the network is operated by an incumbent with ready access to the copper network.) WiMAX has more substantial backhaul bandwidth requirements than legacy cellular applications. Consequently, the use of wireless microwave backhaul is on the rise in North America and existing microwave backhaul links in all regions are being upgraded. Capacities of between 34 Mbit/s and 1 Gbit/s are routinely being deployed with latencies in the order of 1 ms.

In many cases, operators are aggregating sites using wireless technology and then presenting traffic on to fiber networks where convenient. WiMAX in this application competes with microwave radio, E-line and simple extension of the fiber network itself.

=== Triple-play ===
WiMAX directly supports the technologies that make triple-play service offerings possible (such as quality of service and multicast). These are inherent to the WiMAX standard rather than being added on as carrier Ethernet is to Ethernet.

On May 7, 2008, in the United States, Sprint Nextel, Google, Intel, Comcast, Bright House, and Time Warner announced a pooling of an average of 120 MHz of spectrum and merged with Clearwire to market the service. The new company hoped to benefit from combined services offerings and network resources as a springboard past its competitors. The cable companies were expected to provide media services to other partners while gaining access to the wireless network as a Mobile virtual network operator to provide triple-play services.

Some wireless industry analysts, such as Ken Dulaney and Todd Kort at Gartner, were skeptical how the deal would work out: Although fixed-mobile convergence had been a recognized factor in the industry, prior attempts to form partnerships among wireless and cable companies had generally failed to lead to significant benefits for the participants. Other analysts at IDC favored the deal, pointing out that as wireless progresses to higher bandwidth, it inevitably competes more directly with cable, DSL and fiber, inspiring competitors into collaboration. Also, as wireless broadband networks grow denser and usage habits shift, the need for increased backhaul and media services accelerate, therefore the opportunity to leverage high bandwidth assets was expected to increase.

=== Aviation ===
The Aeronautical Mobile Airport Communication System (AeroMACS) is a wireless broadband network for the airport surface intended to link the control tower, aircraft, and fixed assets. In 2007, AeroMACS obtained a worldwide frequency allocation in the 5 GHz aviation band. As of 2018, there were 25 AeroMACS deployments in 8 countries, with at least another 25 deployments planned.

== Support for TDD and FDD ==
IEEE 802.16REVd and IEEE 802.16e standards support both time-division duplexing and frequency-division duplexing as well as a half duplex FDD, that allows for a low cost implementation.

== Connecting ==
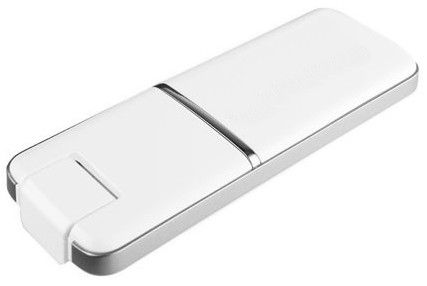
A WiMAX USB modem for mobile access to the Internet

Devices that provide connectivity to a WiMAX network are known as subscriber stations (SS).

Portable units include handsets (similar to cellular smartphones); PC peripherals (PC Cards or USB dongles); and embedded devices in laptops, which are now available for Wi-Fi services. In addition, there is much emphasis by operators on consumer electronics devices such as gaming consoles, MP3 players and similar devices. WiMAX is more similar to Wi-Fi than to other 3G cellular technologies.

The WiMAX Forum website provides a list of certified devices. However, this is not a complete list of devices available as certified modules are embedded into laptops, MIDs (Mobile Internet devices), and other private labeled devices.

=== Gateways ===
WiMAX gateway devices are available as both indoor and outdoor versions from manufacturers including Vecima Networks, Alvarion, Airspan, ZyXEL, Huawei, and Motorola. The list of WiMAX networks and WiMAX Forum provide more links to specific vendors, products and installations. Many of the WiMAX gateways that are offered by manufactures such as these are stand-alone self-install indoor units. Such devices typically sit near the customer's window with the best signal, and provide:

- An integrated Wi-Fi access point to provide the WiMAX Internet connectivity to multiple devices throughout the home or business.
- Ethernet ports to connect directly to a computer, router, printer or DVR on a local wired network.
- One or two analog telephone jacks to connect a land-line phone and take advantage of VoIP.

Indoor gateways are convenient, but radio losses mean that the subscriber may need to be significantly closer to the WiMAX base station than with professionally installed external units.

Outdoor units are roughly the size of a laptop PC, and their installation is comparable to the installation of a residential satellite dish. A higher-gain directional outdoor unit will generally result in greatly increased range and throughput but with the obvious loss of practical mobility of the unit.

=== External modems ===
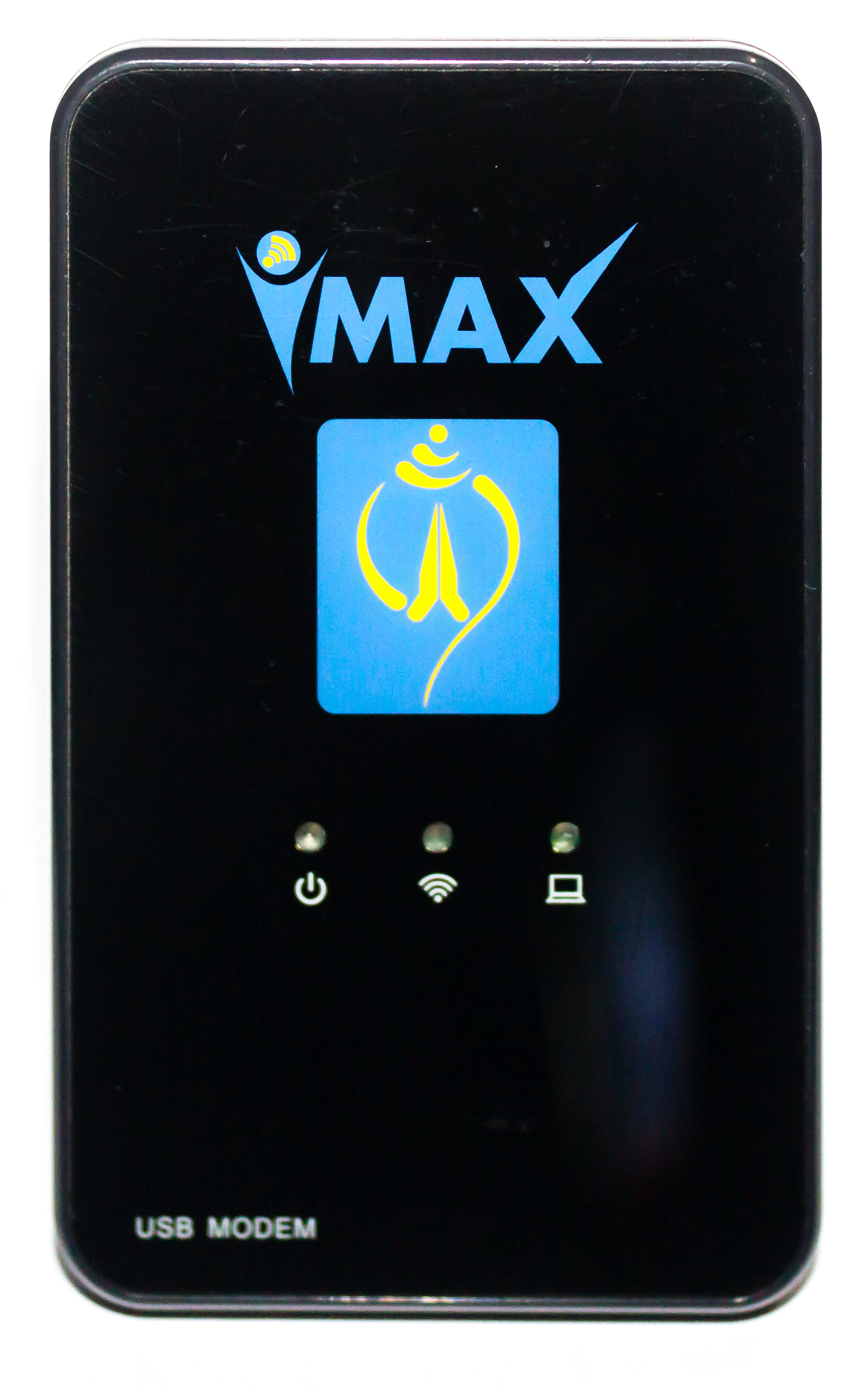
Airstream 1200 USB Modem

USB can provide connectivity to a WiMAX network through a dongle. Generally, these devices are connected to a notebook or net book computer. Dongles typically have omnidirectional antennas which are of lower gain compared to other devices. As such, these devices are best used in areas of good coverage.

=== Mobile phones ===
HTC announced the first WiMAX enabled mobile phone, the Max 4G, on November 12, 2008. The device was only available to certain markets in Russia on the Yota network until 2010.

HTC and Sprint Nextel released the second WiMAX enabled mobile phone, the HTC Evo 4G, March 23, 2010 at the CTIA conference in Las Vegas. The device, made available on June 4, 2010, is capable of both EV-DO(3G) and WiMAX(pre-4G) as well as simultaneous data & voice sessions. Sprint Nextel announced at CES 2012 that it will no longer be offering devices using the WiMAX technology due to financial circumstances, instead, along with its network partner Clearwire, Sprint Nextel rolled out a 4G network having decided to shift and utilize LTE 4G technology instead.

== Technical information ==
=== The IEEE 802.16 standard ===
WiMAX is based upon IEEE 802.16e-2005, approved in December 2005. It is a supplement to the IEEE Std 802.16-2004, and so the actual standard is 802.16-2004 as amended by 802.16e-2005. Thus, these specifications need to be considered together.

IEEE 802.16e-2005 improves upon IEEE 802.16-2004 by:

- Adding support for mobility (soft and hard handover between base stations). This is seen as one of the most important aspects of 802.16e-2005, and is the basis of mobile WiMAX.
- Scaling of the fast Fourier transform (FFT) to the channel bandwidth in order to keep the carrier spacing constant across different channel bandwidths (typically 1.25 MHz, 5 MHz, 10 MHz or 20 MHz). Constant carrier spacing results in a higher spectrum efficiency in wide channels, and a cost reduction in narrow channels. Also known as scalable OFDMA (SOFDMA). Other bands not multiples of 1.25 MHz are defined in the standard, but because the allowed FFT subcarrier numbers are only 128, 512, 1024 and 2048, other frequency bands will not have exactly the same carrier spacing, which might not be optimal for implementations. Carrier spacing is 10.94 kHz.
- Advanced antenna diversity schemes, and hybrid automatic repeat-request (HARQ)
- Adaptive antenna systems (AAS) and MIMO technology
- Denser sub-channelization, thereby improving indoor penetration
- Intro and low-density parity check (LDPC)
- Introducing downlink sub-channelization, allowing administrators to trade coverage for capacity or vice versa
- Adding an extra quality of service (QoS) class for VoIP applications

SOFDMA (used in 802.16e-2005) and OFDM256 (802.16d) are not compatible thus equipment will have to be replaced if an operator is to move to the later standard (e.g., Fixed WiMAX to Mobile WiMAX).

=== Physical layer ===
The original version of the standard on which WiMAX is based (IEEE 802.16) specified a physical layer operating in the 10 to 66 GHz range. 802.16a, updated in 2004 to 802.16-2004, added specifications for the 2 to 11 GHz range. 802.16-2004 was updated by 802.16e-2005 in 2005 and uses scalable orthogonal frequency-division multiple access (SOFDMA), as opposed to the fixed orthogonal frequency-division multiplexing (OFDM) version with 256 sub-carriers (of which 200 are used) in 802.16d. More advanced versions, including 802.16e, also bring multiple antenna support through MIMO. (See WiMAX MIMO) This brings potential benefits in terms of coverage, self installation, power consumption, frequency re-use and bandwidth efficiency. WiMax is the most energy-efficient pre-4G technique among LTE and HSPA+.

=== Media access control layer ===
The WiMAX MAC uses a scheduling algorithm for which the subscriber station needs to compete only once for initial entry into the network. After network entry is allowed, the subscriber station is allocated an access slot by the base station. The time slot can enlarge and contract, but remains assigned to the subscriber station, which means that other subscribers cannot use it. In addition to being stable under overload and over-subscription, the scheduling algorithm can also be more bandwidth efficient. The scheduling algorithm also allows the base station to control QoS parameters by balancing the time-slot assignments among the application needs of the subscriber station.

=== Specifications ===
As a standard intended to satisfy needs of next-generation data networks (4G), WiMAX is distinguished by its dynamic burst algorithm modulation adaptive to the physical environment the RF signal travels through. Modulation is chosen to be more spectrally efficient (more bits per OFDM/SOFDMA symbol). That is, when the bursts have a high signal strength and a high carrier to noise plus interference ratio (CINR), they can be more easily decoded using digital signal processing (DSP). In contrast, operating in less favorable environments for RF communication, the system automatically steps down to a more robust mode (burst profile) which means fewer bits per OFDM/SOFDMA symbol; with the advantage that power per bit is higher and therefore simpler accurate signal processing can be performed.

Burst profiles are used inverse (algorithmically dynamic) to low signal attenuation; meaning throughput between clients and the base station is determined largely by distance. Maximum distance is achieved by the use of the most robust burst setting; that is, the profile with the largest MAC frame allocation trade-off requiring more symbols (a larger portion of the MAC frame) to be allocated in transmitting a given amount of data than if the client were closer to the base station.

The client's MAC frame and their individual burst profiles are defined as well as the specific time allocation. However, even if this is done automatically then the practical deployment should avoid high interference and multipath environments. The reason for which is obviously that too much interference causes the network to function poorly and can also misrepresent the capability of the network.

The system is complex to deploy as it is necessary to track not only the signal strength and CINR (as in systems like GSM) but also how the available frequencies will be dynamically assigned (resulting in dynamic changes to the available bandwidth.) This could lead to cluttered frequencies with slow response times or lost frames.

As a result, the system has to be initially designed in consensus with the base station product team to accurately project frequency use, interference, and general product functionality.

The Asia-Pacific region has surpassed the North American region in terms of 4G broadband wireless subscribers. There were around 1.7 million pre-WiMAX and WiMAX customers in Asia – 29% of the overall market – compared to 1.4 million in the US and Canada.

=== Integration with an IP-based network ===
The WiMAX Forum architecture

The WiMAX Forum has proposed an architecture that defines how a WiMAX network can be connected with an IP based core network, which is typically chosen by operators that serve as Internet Service Providers (ISP); Nevertheless, the WiMAX BS provide seamless integration capabilities with other types of architectures as with packet switched Mobile Networks.

The WiMAX forum proposal defines a number of components, plus some of the interconnections (or reference points) between these, labeled R1 to R5 and R8:

- SS/MS: the Subscriber Station/Mobile Station
- ASN: the Access Service Network
- BS: Base station, part of the ASN
- ASN-GW: the ASN Gateway, part of the ASN
- CSN: the Connectivity Service Network
- HA: Home Agent, part of the CSN
- AAA: Authentication, Authorization and Accounting Server, part of the CSN
- NAP: a Network Access Provider
- NSP: a Network Service Provider

The functional architecture can be designed into various hardware configurations rather than fixed configurations. For example, the architecture is flexible enough to allow remote/mobile stations of varying scale and functionality and Base Stations of varying size – e.g. femto, pico, and mini BS as well as macros.

=== Integration with LTE and 5G NR ===
WiMAX 2.1 and above can be integrated with a LTE TDD network and perform handovers from/to LTE TDD. WiMAX 3 expands the integration to 5G NR.

=== Spectrum allocation ===
There is no uniform global licensed spectrum for WiMAX, however the WiMAX Forum published three licensed spectrum profiles: 2.3 GHz, 2.5 GHz and 3.5 GHz, in an effort to drive standardisation and decrease cost.

In the US, the biggest segment available was around 2.5 GHz, and is already assigned, primarily to Sprint Nextel and Clearwire. Elsewhere in the world, the most-likely bands used will be the Forum approved ones, with 2.3 GHz probably being most important in Asia. Some countries in Asia like India and Indonesia will use a mix of 2.5 GHz, 3.3 GHz and other frequencies. Pakistan's Wateen Telecom uses 3.5 GHz.

Analog TV bands (700 MHz) may become available, but await the complete digital television transition, and other uses have been suggested for that spectrum. In the USA the FCC auction for this spectrum began in January 2008 and, as a result, the biggest share of the spectrum went to Verizon Wireless and the next biggest to AT&T. Both of these companies stated their intention of supporting LTE, a technology which competes directly with WiMAX. EU commissioner Viviane Reding has suggested re-allocation of 500–800 MHz spectrum for wireless communication, including WiMAX.

WiMAX profiles define channel size, TDD/FDD and other necessary attributes in order to have interoperating products. The current fixed profiles are defined for both TDD and FDD profiles. At this point, all of the mobile profiles are TDD only. The fixed profiles have channel sizes of 3.5 MHz, 5 MHz, 7 MHz and 10 MHz. The mobile profiles are 5 MHz, 8.75 MHz and 10 MHz. (Note: the 802.16 standard allows a far wider variety of channels, but only the above subsets are supported as WiMAX profiles.)

Since October 2007, the Radio communication Sector of the International Telecommunication Union (ITU-R) has decided to include WiMAX technology in the IMT-2000 set of standards. This enables spectrum owners (specifically in the 2.5–2.69 GHz band at this stage) to use WiMAX equipment in any country that recognizes the IMT-2000.

=== Inherent limitations ===
WiMAX cannot deliver 70 Mbit/s over 50 km (31 mi). Like all wireless technologies, WiMAX can operate at higher bitrates or over longer distances but not both. Operating at the maximum range of 50 km (31 mi) increases bit error rate and thus results in a much lower bitrate. Conversely, reducing the range (to under 1 km) allows a device to operate at higher bitrates.

A citywide deployment of WiMAX in Perth, Australia demonstrated that customers at the cell-edge with an indoor Customer-premises equipment (CPE) typically obtain speeds of around 1–4 Mbit/s, with users closer to the cell site obtaining speeds of up to 30 Mbit/s.

Like all wireless systems, available bandwidth is shared between users in a given radio sector, so performance could deteriorate in the case of many active users in a single sector. However, with adequate capacity planning and the use of WiMAX's QoS, a minimum guaranteed throughput for each subscriber can be put in place. In practice, most users will have a range of 4–8 Mbit/s services and additional radio cards will be added to the base station to increase the number of users that may be served as required.

=== Silicon implementations ===
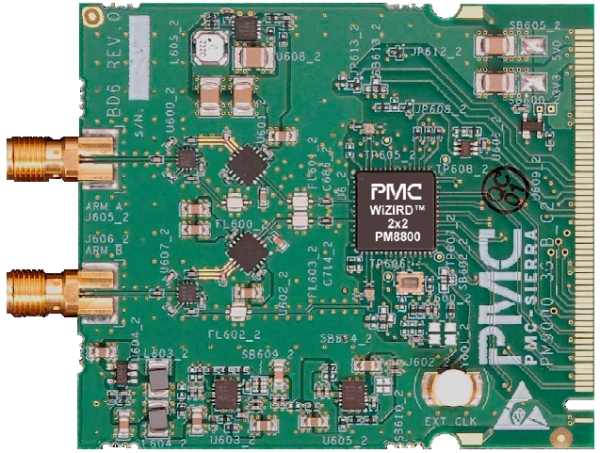
Picture of a WiMAX MIMO board

A number of specialized companies produced baseband ICs and integrated RFICs for WiMAX Subscriber Stations in the 2.3, 2.5 and 3.5 GHz bands (refer to 'Spectrum allocation' above). These companies include, but are not limited to, Beceem, Sequans, and PicoChip.

=== Comparison ===
Comparisons and confusion between WiMAX and Wi-Fi are frequent, because both are related to wireless connectivity and Internet access.

- WiMAX is a long range system, covering many kilometres, that uses licensed or unlicensed spectrum to deliver connection to a network, in most cases the Internet.
- Wi-Fi uses the 2.4 GHz and 5 GHz radio frequency bands to provide access to a local network.
- Wi-Fi is far more popular in end-user devices.
- Wi-Fi runs on the Media Access Control's CSMA/CA protocol, which is connectionless and contention based, whereas WiMAX runs a connection-oriented MAC.
- WiMAX and Wi-Fi have quite different QoS mechanisms:
  - WiMAX uses a QoS mechanism based on connections between the base station and the user device. Each connection is based on specific scheduling algorithms.
  - Wi-Fi uses contention access — all subscriber stations that wish to pass data through a wireless access point (AP) are competing for the AP's attention on a random interrupt basis. This can cause subscriber stations distant from the AP to be repeatedly interrupted by closer stations, greatly reducing their throughput.
- Both IEEE 802.11, which includes Wi-Fi, and IEEE 802.16, which includes WiMAX, define Peer-to-Peer (P2P) and wireless ad hoc networks, where an end user communicates to users or servers on another Local Area Network (LAN) using its access point or base station. However, 802.11 supports also direct ad hoc or peer to peer networking between end user devices without an access point while 802.16 end user devices must be in range of the base station.

Although Wi-Fi and WiMAX are designed for different situations, they are complementary. WiMAX network operators typically provide a WiMAX Subscriber Unit that connects to the metropolitan WiMAX network and provides Wi-Fi connectivity within the home or business for computers and smartphones. This enables the user to place the WiMAX Subscriber Unit in the best reception area, such as a window, and have data access throughout their property.

=== Conformance testing ===
TTCN-3 test specification language is used for the purposes of specifying conformance tests for WiMAX implementations. The WiMAX test suite is being developed by a Specialist Task Force at ETSI (STF 252).

== Associations ==
=== WiMAX Forum ===
The WiMAX Forum is a non profit organization formed to promote the adoption of WiMAX compatible products and services.

A major role for the organization is to certify the interoperability of WiMAX products. Those that pass conformance and interoperability testing achieve the "WiMAX Forum Certified" designation, and can display this mark on their products and marketing materials. Some vendors claim that their equipment is "WiMAX-ready", "WiMAX-compliant", or "pre-WiMAX", if they are not officially WiMAX Forum Certified.

Another role of the WiMAX Forum is to promote the spread of knowledge about WiMAX. In order to do so, it has a certified training program that is currently offered in English and French. It also offers a series of member events and endorses some industry events.

WiSOA logo

=== WiMAX Spectrum Owners Alliance ===
WiSOA was the first global organization composed exclusively of owners of WiMAX spectrum with plans to deploy WiMAX technology in those bands. WiSOA focused on the regulation, commercialisation, and deployment of WiMAX spectrum in the 2.3–2.5 GHz and the 3.4–3.5 GHz ranges. WiSOA merged with the Wireless Broadband Alliance in April 2008.

=== Telecommunications Industry Association ===
In 2011, the Telecommunications Industry Association released three technical standards (TIA-1164, TIA-1143, and TIA-1140) that cover the air interface and core networking aspects of Wi-Max High-Rate Packet Data (HRPD) systems using a Mobile Station/Access Terminal (MS/AT) with a single transmitter.

Speed vs. mobility of wireless systems: Wi-Fi, High Speed Packet Access (HSPA), Universal Mobile Telecommunications System (UMTS), GSM

== Development ==
The IEEE 802.16m-2011 standard was the core technology for WiMAX 2. The IEEE 802.16m standard was submitted to the ITU for IMT-Advanced standardization. IEEE 802.16m is one of the major candidates for IMT-Advanced technologies by ITU. Among many enhancements, IEEE 802.16m systems can provide four times faster data speed than the WiMAX Release 1.

WiMAX Release 2 provided backward compatibility with Release 1. WiMAX operators could migrate from release 1 to release 2 by upgrading channel cards or software. The WiMAX 2 Collaboration Initiative was formed to help this transition.

It was anticipated that using 4X2 MIMO in the urban microcell scenario with only a single 20 MHz TDD channel available system wide, the 802.16m system can support both 120 Mbit/s downlink and 60 Mbit/s uplink per site simultaneously. It was expected that the WiMAX Release 2 would be available commercially in the 2011–2012 timeframe.

WiMAX Release 2.1 was released in early-2010s which broke compatibility with earlier WiMAX networks. Significant number of operators have migrated to the new standard that is compatible with TD-LTE by the end of 2010s.

== Interference ==
A field test conducted in 2007 by SUIRG (Satellite Users Interference Reduction Group) with support from the U.S. Navy, the Global VSAT Forum, and several member organizations yielded results showing interference at 12 km when using the same channels for both the WiMAX systems and satellites in C-band.

== Deployments ==
As of October 2010, the WiMAX Forum claimed over 592 WiMAX (fixed and mobile) networks deployed in over 148 countries, covering over 621 million people. By February 2011, the WiMAX Forum cited coverage of over 823 million people, and estimated coverage to over 1 billion people by the end of the year. Note that coverage means the offer of availability of WiMAX service to populations within various geographies, not the number of WiMAX subscribers.

South Korea launched a WiMAX network in the second quarter of 2006. Spain delivered full coverage in two cities Seville and Málaga in 2008 reaching 20,000 portable units. By the end of 2008 there were 350,000 WiMAX subscribers in Korea.

Worldwide, by early 2010 WiMAX seemed to be ramping quickly relative to other available technologies, though access in North America lagged. Yota, the largest WiMAX network operator in the world in 4Q 2009, announced in May 2010 that it would move new network deployments to LTE and, subsequently, change its existing networks as well.

A study published in September 2010 by Blycroft Publishing estimated 800 management contracts from 364 WiMAX operations worldwide offering active services (launched or still trading as opposed to just licensed and still to launch). The WiMAX Forum announced on Aug 16, 2011 that there were more than 20 million WiMAX subscribers worldwide, the high-water mark for this technology. http://wimaxforum.org/Page/News/PR/20110816_WiMAX_Subscriptions_Surpass_20_Million_Globally

== See also ==
- Cognitive radio
- Comparison of wireless data standards
- Evolved HSPA
- High-Speed Packet Access
- List of WiMAX networks
- Mobile broadband
- Mobile VoIP
- Municipal broadband
- Packet Burst Broadband
- Super Wi-Fi
- Switched mesh
- WiBro (mobile WiMax in Korea)
- Wireless bridge
- Wireless local loop
