= 2008 United States wireless spectrum auction =

Auction of radio frequencies

The United States 700 MHz FCC wireless spectrum auction, officially known as Auction 73, was started by the Federal Communications Commission (FCC) on January 24, 2008 for the rights to operate the 700 MHz radio frequency band in the United States. The details of process were the subject of debate among several telecommunications companies, including Verizon Wireless, AT&T Mobility, as well as the Internet company Google. Much of the debate swirled around the open access requirements set down by the Second Report and Order released by the FCC determining the process and rules for the auction. All bidding was required by law to commence by January 28.

== Overview ==
Full-power TV stations were forced to transition to digital broadcasting in order to free 108 MHz of radio spectrum for newer Wireless services. Most analog broadcasts ceased on June 12, 2009.

The 700 MHz spectrum was previously used for analog television broadcasting, specifically UHF channels 52 through 69. The FCC ruled that the 700 MHz spectrum would no longer be necessary for TV because of the improved spectral efficiency of digital broadcasts. Digital broadcasts allow TV channels to be broadcast on adjacent channels without having to leave empty TV channels as guard bands between them. All broadcasters were required to move to the frequencies occupied by channels 2 through 51 as part of the digital TV transition.

=== Precedents ===
A similar reallocation was employed in 1989 to expand analog cellphone service, having previously eliminated TV channels 70-83 at the uppermost UHF frequencies. This created an unusual situation where old TV tuning equipment was able to listen to cellular phone calls, although such activity was made illegal and the FCC prohibited the sale of future devices with that capability.

=== Prior auctions ===
Some of the 700 MHz spectrum licenses were already auctioned in Auctions 44 and 49. Paired channels 54/59 (lower-700 MHz block C) and unpaired channel 55 (block D) were sold and in some areas were already being used for broadcasting and Internet access. For example, Qualcomm MediaFLO in 2007 started using channel 55 for broadcasting mobile TV to cell phones in some markets. Qualcomm later ended the service and sold (at a large profit) channel 55 nationwide to AT&T Mobility, along with channel 56 in the Northeast Corridor and much of California. Dish Network bought channel 56 (block E) licenses in the remainder of the nation's media markets, so far using it only for testing ATSC-M/H. As of 2015, AT&T does not appear to be using block D or E (band class 29) yet, but plans to use link aggregation for increased download speeds and capacity.

== Auction rules and process ==
For the 700-MHz auction, the FCC designed a new multi-round process that limits the number of package bids that each bidder can submit (12 items and 12 package bids) and the prices at which they can be submitted, provides computationally intensive feedback prices similar to the pricing approach. This package bidding process (which is often referred to as combinatorial auctions) was the first of its kind to be used by the FCC in an actual auction. Bidders were allowed to bid on individual licenses or on an all-or-nothing bid which could be done up to twelve packages, which the bidder determined at any point in the auction. Doing the auction this way allowed the bidder to avoid the exposure problem when licenses are complements. The provisional winning bids are the set of consistent bids that maximize total revenues. The 700 MHz auction represented a good test-case for package bidding for two reasons. First, the 700 MHz auction only involves 12 licenses: 2 bands (one 10 MHz and one 20 MHz) in each of the 6 regions. Secondly, prospective bidders had expressed interest in alternative packaging because some Internet service providers had different needs and the flexibility would benefit them. The FCC issued Public Notice DA00-1486 adopted and described the package bidding rules for the 700 MHz auction.

The FCC's original proposal allowed only nine package bids: the six 30 MHz regional bids and three nationwide bids (10, 20, or 30 MHz). Although these nine packages were consistent with the expressed desires of many prospective bidders, others felt that the nine packages were too restrictive. The activity rule is unchanged, aside from a new definition of activity and a lower activity requirement of 50%. A bidder must be active on 50% of its current eligibility or its eligibility in the next round will be reduced to two times its activity. Bids made in different rounds were treated as mutually exclusive and a bidder wishing to add a license or package to its provisional winnings must renew the provisional winning bids in the current round.

The FCC placed rules on public safety for the auction. 20 MHz of the valuable 700 MHz spectrum were set aside for the creation of a public/private partnership that will eventually roll out to a new nationwide broadband network tailored to the requirements of public safety. The FCC offered the commercial licensee extra spectrum adjacent to the public safety block that the licensee can use as it wants. The licensee is allowed to use whatever bandwidth that is available on the public safety side of the network to offer data services of their own.

== Google involvement ==
In an effort to encourage network neutrality, groups such as Public Knowledge, MoveOn.org, Media Access Project, along with individuals such as Craigslist founder Craig Newmark, and Harvard Law professor Lawrence Lessig appealed to the Federal Communications Commission to make the newly freed airways open access to the public.

Prior to the bidding process, Google asked that the spectrum be free to lease wholesale and the devices operating under the spectrum be open. At the time, many providers such as Verizon and AT&T used technological measures to block external applications. In return, Google guaranteed a minimum bid of $4.6 billion. Google's specific requests were the adoption of these policies:

- Open applications: Consumers should be able to download and utilize any software applications, content, or services they desire;
- Open devices: Consumers should be able to utilize a handheld communications device with whatever wireless network they prefer;
- Open services: Third parties (resellers) should be able to acquire wireless services from a 700 MHz licensee on a wholesale basis, based on reasonably nondiscriminatory commercial terms; and
- Open networks: Third parties (like internet service providers) should be able to interconnect at any technically feasible point in a 700 MHz licensee's wireless network.

The result of the auction was that Google was outbid by others in the auction, triggering the open platform restrictions Google had asked for without having to actually purchase any licenses. Google was actively involved in the bidding process although it had no intentions of actually winning any licenses. The reason for this was that it could push up the price of the bidding process in order to reach the US$4.6B reserve price, therefore triggering the open source restrictions listed above. Had Google not been actively involved in the bidding process, it would have made sense for businesses to suppress their bidding strategies in order to trigger a new auction without the restrictions imposed by Google and the FCC. Google's upfront payment of $287 million in order to participate in the bidding process was largely recovered after the auction since it had not actually purchased any licences. Despite this, Google ended paying interest costs, which resulted in an estimated loss of 13 million dollars.

The FCC ruled in favor of Google's requests. Only two of the four requirements were put in place on the upper C-Block, open applications and open devices. Google had wanted the purchaser to allow 'rental' of the blocks to different providers.

In retaliation, on September 13, 2007, Verizon filed a lawsuit against the Federal Communications Commission to remove the provisions Google had asked for. Verizon called the rules "arbitrary and capricious, unsupported by substantial evidence and otherwise contrary to law."

On October 23, Verizon chose to drop the lawsuit after losing its appeal for a speedy resolution on October 3. However, CTIA - The Wireless Association challenged the same regulations in a lawsuit filed the same day. On November 13, 2008, CTIA dropped its lawsuit against the FCC.

== Auction ==
The auction divided UHF spectrum into five blocks:

- lower block A: 12 MHz bandwidth (698–704 and 728–734 MHz, TV 52 and 57)
- lower block B: 12 MHz bandwidth (704–710 and 734–740 MHz, TV 53 and 58)
- lower block E: 6 MHz bandwidth (722–728 MHz, TV 56)
- upper block C: 22 MHz bandwidth (746–757 and 776–787 MHz, TV 60/61 and 65/66)
- upper block D: 10 MHz bandwidth (758–763 and 788–793 MHz, TV 62 and 67)

The FCC placed very detailed rules about the process of this auction of the 698–806 MHz part of the wireless spectrum. Bids were anonymous and designed to promote competition. The aggregate reserve price for all block C licenses was approximately $4.6 billion. The total reserve price for all five blocks being auctioned in Auction 73 was just over $10 billion.

== Results of the auction ==
Auction 73 generally went as planned by telecommunications analysts. In total, Auction 73 raised $19.592 billion. Verizon Wireless and AT&T Mobility together accounted for $16.3 billion of the total revenue. Of the 214 approved applicants, 101 successfully purchased at least one license. Despite their heavy involvement with the auction, Google did not purchase any licenses. However, Google did place the minimum bid on Block C licenses in order to ensure that the license would be required to be open-access.

The results for each of the five blocks:

- Block A – Verizon Wireless and U.S. Cellular both bought 25 licenses each. In this block, Verizon targeted urban areas, while U.S. Cellular bought licenses primarily in the northern portion of the U.S. Cavalier Telephone and CenturyTel also bought 23 and 21 licenses, respectively.
- Block B – AT&T Mobility was the biggest buyer in the B block, with 227 licenses totaling $6.6 billion. U.S. Cellular and Verizon bought 127 and 77 licenses, respectively. AT&T Mobility and Verizon Wireless bought licenses around the country, while U.S. Cellular continued with its strategy to buy licenses in northern regions.
- Block C – Of the 10 licenses in the C Block, Verizon Wireless bought the 7 that cover the contiguous 48 states (and Hawaii). Those seven licenses cost Verizon roughly $4.7 Billion. Of the other three, Triad Broadcasting bought the two covering Alaska, Puerto Rico and the U.S. Virgin Islands, while Small Ventures USA L.P. bought the one covering the Gulf of Mexico.
- Block D – Amid some controversy, no licenses were sold in Block D because the reserve price was not met. The FCC had set the reserve price on the spectrum at $1.3 billion, but the highest bidder (Qualcomm) only bid $472 million. This piece of spectrum remains unsold and has not been scheduled for another auction.
- Block E – EchoStar spent $711 million to purchase 168 of the 176 available Block E licenses. This block, made up of unpaired spectrum, will likely be used to stream television shows. Qualcomm also bought 5 licenses.

After the end of Auction 73, there remained some licenses that either went unsold or were defaulted on by the winning bidder from Blocks A and B. A new auction, Auction 92, was held on July 19, 2011 to sell the 700 MHz band licenses that were still available. The auction closed on July 28, 2011, with 7 bidders having won 16 licenses worth $19.8 million.

== Interoperability issues ==
Six years after the end of the auction of 700 MHz spectrum, block A remained largely unused, although T-Mobile USA began to deploy its extended-range LTE in 2015 on licenses purchased from Verizon Wireless and cleared of RF interference in several areas by TV stations changing off of channel 51. This delay was caused by technical issues which were regulatory and possibly anticompetitive in nature.

After the March 2008 conclusion of Auction 73, Motorola initiated steps to have 3GPP establish a new industry standard (later designated as band class 17) that would be limited to the lower 700 MHz B and C blocks. In proposing band class 17, Motorola cited the need to address concerns about high-power transmissions of TV stations still broadcasting on channel 51 and the lower-700 MHz D and E blocks. As envisioned and ultimately adopted, the band class 17 standard allows LTE operations in only the lower-700 MHz B and C blocks using a specific signaling protocol that would filter out all other frequencies. Although band class 17 operates on two of the three blocks common to band class 12, band class 17 devices use more narrow electronic filters, which have the effect of permitting a smaller range of frequencies to pass through the filter. In addition, band class 12 and 17 signaling protocols are not compatible.

The creation of two non-interoperable band classes has had numerous effects. Customers are unable to switch between a licensee deploying its service using band class 17 and a licensee that provides its service using band class 12 without purchasing a new device (even when the two operators use the same 2G and 3G technologies and bands), and band class 12 and 17 devices cannot roam on each other's cellular networks.

When deploying its LTE network, C Spire Wireless decided not to use A block because of the lack of band-12 support in mobile devices, issues with roaming, and the increased cost of base stations due to lack of supply. US Cellular deployed a band class 12 LTE network, however not all of US Cellular's devices were able to access it. In particular, the iPhone 5S and iPhone 5C could not. Other wireless telecommunication providers launched LTE band class 12 networks, but have not been able to offer smartphones that access them, instead resorting to fixed or mobile wireless broadband modems. As of April 2015, only three telecom providers were offering smartphones that use band 12: US Cellular, T-Mobile USA, and Nex-Tech Wireless.

While smaller US telecommunication providers were upset at the lack of interoperability, AT&T defended the creation of band 17 and told the other carriers to seek interoperability with Sprint and T-Mobile instead. However, in September 2013, AT&T changed its stance and committed to support and sell band-12 devices.

Following AT&T's commitment the Federal Communications Commission ruled:

- AT&T must fully deploy a Multi-Frequency Band Indicator (MFBI) software feature in its 700 MHz network within 24 months of September 30, 2013. The end of the 24-month period will also commence the beginning of the band-12-capable device rollout period.
- Once MFBI has been fully implemented by AT&T, AT&T shall provide LTE roaming to carriers with compatible band-12 devices.
- During the first year of the device rollout period, 50% of all new unique devices will be band-12 capable.
- Commencing at the conclusion of the second year of the device rollout period, all new unique devices will be band-12 capable.

Consistent with these commitments, AT&T anticipates that its focus and advocacy within the 3GPP standards setting process will shift to band-12-related projects and work streams. AT&T must place priority within the 3GPP RAN committee on the development of various band-12 carrier-aggregation scenarios. Upon completing implementation of the MFBI feature, AT&T anticipates that its focus on new standards related to the paired lower-700 MHz spectrum will be almost exclusively on band 12 configurations, features and capabilities.

Additionally, Dish Network agreed to lower its maximum effective radiated power levels on block E, which is on the lower adjacent channel to the downlink (tower-to-user transmissions) for block A. It did this in exchange for the FCC allowing it to operate the block as a one-way service, effectively making it a broadcast, although it could still be interactive through other means. Since Dish has already been experimentally operating it as a single-frequency network, this should not have a significant effect on whatever service it might offer in the future.

== See also ==
- Digital dividend after digital television transition
- 2016 United States wireless spectrum auction
- Electromagnetic spectrum
- Frequency allocation
- GSM frequency bands
- IEEE 802.22
- List of LTE networks
- LTE Frequency bands
- Open Communication
- Spectrum auction
- Spectrum reallocation
- UMTS frequency bands
- White spaces (radio)
- White spaces (database)
