= IEEE 802.11af =

Lond distance Wireless networking standard

- 1 kilometer or more

IEEE 802.11af, also referred to as White-Fi and Super Wi-Fi (which is also the name of a separate group of implementations), is a wireless computer networking standard in the 802.11 family, that allows wireless local area network (WLAN) operation in TV white space spectrum in the VHF and UHF bands between 54 and 790 MHz. The standard was approved in February 2014. Cognitive radio technology is used to transmit on unused portions of TV channel band allocations, with the standard taking measures to limit interference for primary users, such as analog TV, digital TV, and wireless microphones.

== Physical layer ==
The physical (PHY) layer in 802.11af is based on the orthogonal frequency-division multiplexing (OFDM) scheme specified in 802.11ac. (Note: Broadcast TV&Radio(DVB-T, Digital Radio Mondiale) also uses OFDM in this band.) The propagation path loss as well as the attenuation by materials such as brick and concrete is lower in the UHF and VHF bands than in the 2.4 and 5 GHz bands, which increases the possible range compared to 802.11 a/b/g/n/ac. The frequency channels are 6 to 8 MHz wide, depending on the regulatory domain. Up to four channels may be bonded in either one or two contiguous blocks. MIMO operation is possible with up to four streams used for either space–time block code (STBC) or multi-user (MU-MIMO) operation.

=== Data rates ===
The achievable data rate per spatial stream is 26.7 Mbit/s for 6 and 7 MHz channels and 35.6 Mbit/s for 8 MHz channels. With four spatial streams and four bonded channels, the maximum data rate is 426.7 Mbit/s in 6 and 7 MHz channels and 568.9 Mbit/s for 8 MHz channels. GI (Guard Interval) : Timing between symbols

Data rate per spatial stream (Mbit/s)
MCS index	Modulation type	Coding rate	6 and 7 MHz channels		8 MHz channels	
MCS index	Modulation type	Coding rate	6 μs GI	3 μs GI	4.5 μs GI	2.25 μs GI
0	BPSK	1/2	1.8	2.0	2.4	2.7
1	QPSK	1/2	3.6	4.0	4.8	5.3
2	QPSK	3/4	5.4	6.0	7.2	8.0
3	16-QAM	1/2	7.2	8.0	9.6	10.7
4	16-QAM	3/4	10.8	12.0	14.4	16.0
5	64-QAM	2/3	14.4	16.0	19.2	21.3
6	64-QAM	3/4	16.2	18.0	21.6	24.0
7	64-QAM	5/6	18.0	20.0	24.0	26.7
8	256-QAM	3/4	21.6	24.0	28.8	32.0
9	256-QAM	5/6	24.0	26.7	32.0	35.6

== Spectrum regulation ==
Access points and stations determine their position using a satellite positioning system such as GPS and use the Internet to query a geolocation database (GDB) provided by a regional regulatory agency to discover which frequency channels are available for use at a given time and position.

In the United States, the Federal Communications Commission (FCC) permits TV white space operation in 6 MHz channels between 54 and 698 MHz in TV channels 2, 5, 6, 14–35, and 38–51, with the geolocation database granting use for up to 48 hours. For mobile stations, allowed transmit power is fixed to 100 mW per 6 MHz channel, or 40 mW if an adjacent channel is in use by a primary user.

In the European Union, the European Telecommunications Standards Institute (ETSI) and Ofcom permit TV white space operation in 8 MHz channels between 490 and 790 MHz, with the GDB granting use for up to 2 hours. The allowed transmit power is dynamically set on a per-station basis, based on factors including the geographical distance to the next primary user in the given frequency. This closed-loop scheme requires each station to report its position after a timer has expired or it has moved 50 m or more, and to stop transmitting within 5 s when instructed to do so. Compared to the open-loop scheme used by the FCC, the closed-loop scheme used by the ETSI and Ofcom is more granular and allows for a more efficient spectrum utilization.

== Comparison with 802.11ah ==
IEEE 802.11ah is another WLAN standard for sub 1 GHz operation being developed by the IEEE. Unlike 802.11af, it operates in unlicensed bands. Its main application is expected to be in sensor networks.

== Comparison with 802.22 ==
In addition to 802.11af, the IEEE has standardized another white space cognitive radio standard, 802.22. While 802.11af is a wireless LAN standard designed for ranges up to 1 km, 802.22 is a wireless regional area network (WRAN) standard, for ranges up to 100 km. Coexistence between 802.22 and 802.11af standards can be implemented either in centralized or distributed manners and based on various coexistence techniques.

== See also ==
- Super Wi-Fi
- Geolocation Database
