= 700 MHz auction in Canada =

700 MHz auction in Canada was a spectrum auction that took place in 2014 from January 14 to February 13. During this auction, the government of Canada licensed the rights to the 700 MHz radio spectrum to eight telecommunication companies.

== Purpose ==
The Canadian government wished to "encourage more choice and lower prices in Canada's wireless sector" as a result of this auction. Beyond the public good, there was likely also a political motivation to raise government revenues without increasing taxes through transfer of a crown asset into private hands. The Canadian auction took place against the backdrop of similar United States 700 MHz spectrum auctions.

== Spectrum and process ==
The 108 MHz of spectrum from 698 to 804 MHz was a block of 18 television channels that became available for other uses after Canada's switch from analogue television to digital television in August 2011, and the repacking of the remaining TV stations into the lower channels that it allowed. Being lower in frequency than the other radio bands already in use, it has better radio propagation characteristics due to the physics of longer wavelengths.

While not necessarily faster, this band has the advantage of penetrating through objects with less attenuation better than the existing bands. It is also able to travel longer distances, which reduces the need for more infrastructures such as base stations (including radio towers) for cellular networks. This can translate into lower costs for providers such as mobile network operators.

For this auction, the band was divided into seven licence blocks in 14 areas, creating a total of 98 licences for the government to sell. During this 22-day auction, 108 rounds of bidding occurred. On February 25, 2014, The Globe and Mail reported that, according to sources, some rounds of bidding reached a total of over $7 billion.

== Participants and outcome ==
The initial list of applicants included both major and small players in the wireless industry. Globalive Wireless Management Corp. was among the small players until the day before the beginning of the auction, however, it withdrew from the auction due to the refusal of its major stakeholder to fund the plan. The company's withdrawal, conflicted with the government's plan to have a fourth major player in every region of the country. Below is the initial list of applicants and the status of their application:

Applicant	Application Status
1770129 Alberta Inc.	Withdrawn
Bell Mobility Inc.	Qualified
BH Wave Acquisition Corporation	Withdrawn
Bragg Communications Incorporated	Qualified
Feenix Wireless Inc.	Qualified
Globalive Wireless Management Corp.	Withdrawn
MTS Inc.	Qualified
Novus Wireless Inc.	Qualified
Rogers Communications Partnership	Qualified
Saskatchewan Telecommunications	Qualified
TBayTel	Qualified
TELUS Communications Company	Qualified
The Catalyst Capital Group Inc.	Withdrawn
Vecima Networks Inc.	Withdrawn
Vidéotron s.e.n.c.	Qualified

At the end of the auction, eight of the ten participants won 97 licences and the government generated a total of $5,270,636,002 in revenues. Below is the list of winners and the number of their corresponding licences:

Bidder	Number of Licences Won	Final Price
Rogers	22	3,291,738,000
Bell	31	565,705,517
TELUS	30	1,142,953,484
MTS	1	8,772,072
SaskTel	1	7,556,929
TBayTel	0	—
Vidéotron	7	233,328,000
Bragg	4	20,298,000
Novus	0	—
Feenix	1	284,000

== See also ==
- Digital dividend after digital television transition
- List of Canadian mobile phone companies
- List of LTE networks
- Spectrum auction
- Spectrum reallocation
