= Rural Internet =

Internet service in rural areas

Rural Internet describes the characteristics of Internet service in rural areas (also referred to as "the country" or "countryside"), which are settled places outside towns and cities. Inhabitants live in villages, hamlets, on farms, and in other isolated houses. Mountains and other terrain can impede rural Internet access.

High-speed, wireless Internet service is becoming increasingly common in rural areas. Here, service providers deliver Internet service over radio-frequency via special radio-equipped antennas.

Methods for broadband Internet access in rural areas include:

- Mobile Internet (broadband if HSPA or higher)
- Hybrid Access Networks
- Power-line Internet
- Terrestrial Wireless Internet
- Satellite Internet
- ADSL loop extender
- Internet of Things
- White Space Internet

== Digital divide ==
Scholarship on the topic of the digital divide has shifted from an understanding of people who do and do not have access to the Internet to an analysis of the quality of Internet access. Because opting out of Internet activity is no longer a choice with Internet-only customer service, online banking, and online schooling, Internet access has become an increasing need in rural communities with inadequate infrastructure.

Although government programs such as E-rate provisions provide Internet connection to schools and libraries under the U.S. federal government, more general Internet access to a broader community has not been directly addressed in policy. The provision of "national" Internet services tends to favor urban metropolitan regions. For a long time, many within the U.S. considered the Internet to be a luxury. In 2001, then FCC Chair Michael Powell said, "I think there's a Mercedes divide. I'd like to have one. I can't afford one," when asked about solutions to shrinking the digital divide. At the time, the Internet was still largely new, as more than half of the U.S. lacked access to any home Internet. In 2021, 77% of Americans had home broadband according to a Pew Research Center survey from that year. The attitude in the U.S. has largely shifted since Powell's remarks, however, as under the current administration and President Joe Biden there is a common belief that "broadband is infrastructure" and that it must be treated as such.

The digital divide is even more prominent in developing countries, where physical access to Internet services is at a much lower rate. While developed countries such as the U.S. face the challenge of providing universal service (ensuring that everyone has access to Internet service in the home), developing countries face the challenge of providing universal access (ensuring that everyone has the opportunity to make use of the Internet). For example, in Egypt there are only about six phone lines per 100 people, with less than two lines per 100 people in rural areas, which makes it even more difficult for people to access the Internet.

== In the United States ==
The United States Department of Agriculture's Economic Research Service has provided numerous studies and data on the Internet in rural America. One such article from the Agricultural Outlook magazine, "Communications & the Internet in Rural America", summarizes Internet use in rural areas of the United States in 2002. It states that "Internet use by rural and urban households has also increased significantly during the 1990s, so significantly that it has one of the fastest rates of adoption for any household service."

Another area for inclusion of the Internet is American farming. One study reviewed data from 2003 and found that "56 percent of farm operators used the Internet while 31 percent of rural workers used it at their place of work." In later years, challenges to economical rural telecommunications remain. People in inner city areas are closer together, so the access network to connect them is shorter and cheaper to build and maintain, while rural areas require more equipment per customer. However, even with this challenge the demand for services continues to grow.

In 2011, the Federal Communications Commission (FCC) proposed to use the Universal Service Fund to subsidize rural broadband Internet services. In 2019, the FCC estimated that only 73.6% of the rural population had access to broadband services at 25 Mbps in 2017, compared to 98.3% of the population in urban areas. However, many studies have contested the FCC findings, claiming a greater number of Americans are without access to Internet services at sufficient speeds. For instance, in 2019 the Pew Research Center found that only about two-thirds of rural Americans claimed to have a broadband Internet connection at home, and although the gap in mobile technology ownership between rural and urban adults has narrowed, rural adults remain less likely to own these devices.

One study in particular examined the ways in which inaccessibility for rural and "quasi-rural" residents affects their daily lives, conceptualizing issues of accessibility as a form of socioeconomic inequity. By using Illinois as a case study—a state with both urban and rural environments—the authors demonstrate how the rural-urban digital divide negatively impacts those who live in areas that fall between the two distinct categories of rural and urban. Interviews with residents from Illinois describe "missed pockets," or areas in which service installation is not available or far too expensive. This inaccessibility leads many to experience sentiments of social isolation as residents feel disconnected from current events, cultural trends, and even close friends and family members.

Internet access inequalities are further deepened by public policy and commercial investment. In 2003, The Information Society published an article explaining how exchange areas and local access transport areas (LATAs) arrange citizens into markets for telecommunication companies, which centralizes access rather than encouraging businesses to cater to more remote communities. These areas were created through regulatory measures intended to ensure greater access and are perpetuated by investment patterns as more disparate communities hold less potential for profits, thus creating "missed pockets."

== In Canada ==
In Canada, when pressed by Member of Parliament David de Burgh Graham, the Federation of Canadian Municipalities did not see access to the Internet as a right. Telecommunications co-operatives like Antoine-Labelle provide an alternative to big Internet service providers.

== In Spain ==
In Spain, the Guifi.net project has been for some people the only alternative to get access to the Internet. Usually, neighbors are responsible to collect the necessary money to buy the network equipment that will establish a Wireless link with another zone that already has Internet access. There have also been cases in which the city council itself has invested in the infrastructure.

== In the United Kingdom ==
In the UK, the government aimed to provide superfast broadband (speeds of 24 Mbit/s or more) to 95% of the country by 2017. In 2014, a study by the Oxford Internet Institute found that in areas less than 30 km (20 mi) from large cities, Internet speed dropped below 2 Mbit/s, the speed designated as "adequate" by the government.

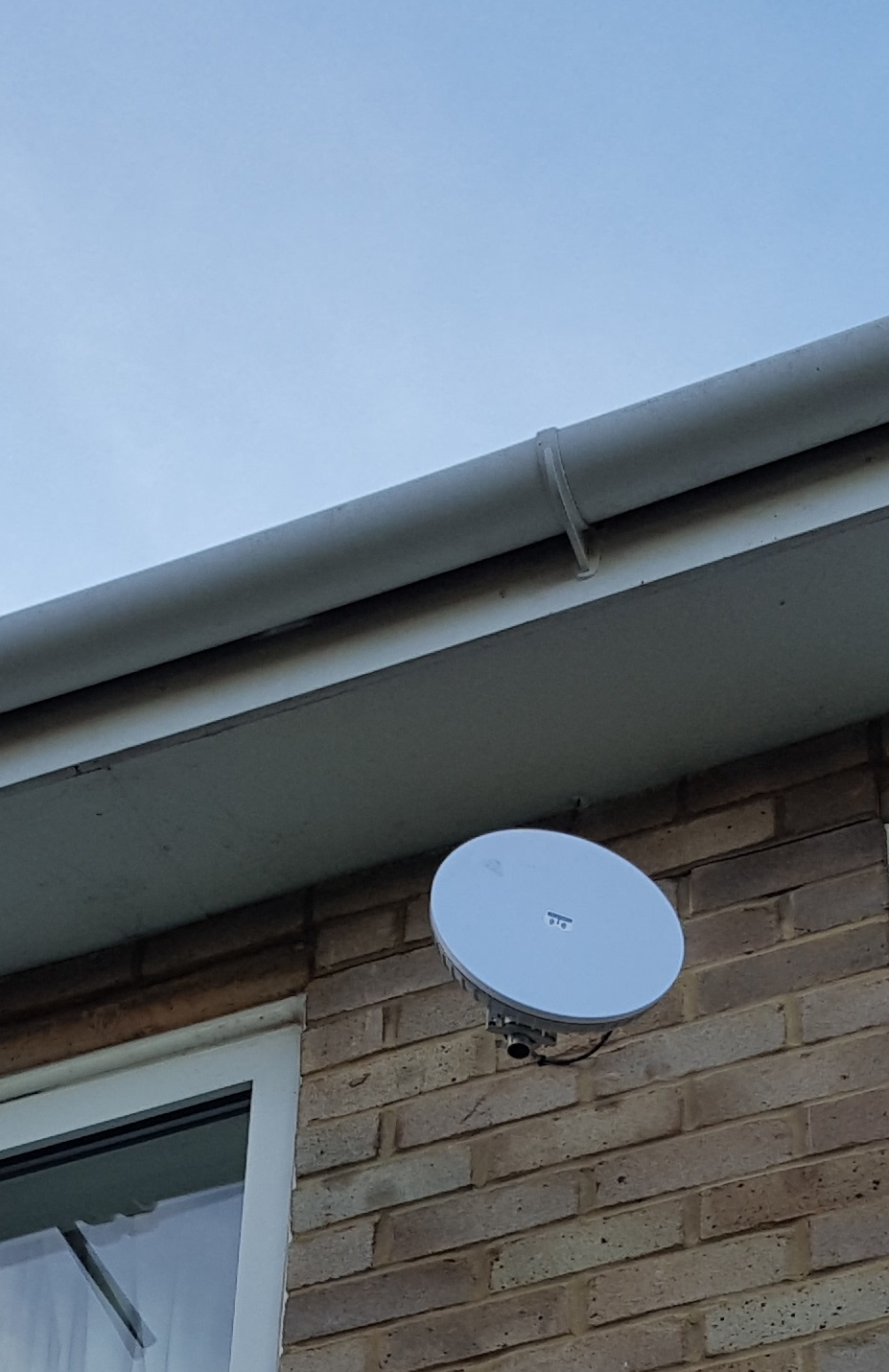
A CableFree CPE Radio installed for rural internet in the Cotswolds, UK

Frustrated by the slow progress being made by private telecoms companies, some rural communities have built their own broadband networks, such as the B4RN initiative.

== In India ==
India has the second-biggest online market globally, yet a large portion of its populace – almost 700 million individuals – is detached. Dependable broadband connections are vital for many youngsters who are being homeschooled during the COVID-19 pandemic. That may change as Indian web access provider, AirJaldi, is widening access to rural areas through an undertaking with worldwide tech giant Microsoft.

== Internet of Things ==
Due to poor telecommunication access in most rural areas, low-energy solutions such as those offered by Internet of Things networks are seen as a cost-effective solution well adapted to agricultural environments. Tasks such as controlling livestock conditions and numbers, the state of crops, and pests are progressively being taken over by M2M communications. Companies such as Sigfox, Cisco Systems and Fujitsu are delving into the agricultural market, offering innovative solutions to common problems in countries such as the U.S., Japan, Ireland and Uruguay.

== Innovation and solutions ==
There is increasing conversation around the growing social necessity of being connected in today's world and moreover, growing social expectation that one is connected either with at home broadband, reliable cell-service, or at least email access. Currently, rural areas often depend on small, unreliable ISPs and scrape by "siphoning from surplus data and bandwidth capacity, creating their own systems of redundancy, or (in some cases) launching community-based, local ISPs when large incumbent providers fail to show an interest in the area."

Many of the difficulties faced by rural communities are "geo-policy barriers," defined as "chokepoints [or] mechanisms of control created through the interaction of geography, market forces, and public policies" that constrict not just access, but "also construct both communication and communities." In the US, regulatory mandates have helped extend basic telecommunications to rural areas while mitigating market failure. However, despite efforts from the government, the telecommunications industry has stayed relatively monopolized; therefore, little competition has resulted in basic telecommunications without adequate connectivity for the developing needs of rural citizens. One state-based effort that has proved successful in adequately connecting Americans is EAS, or "extended area service", programs, which "generally reduce intra-LATAS [local access and transport areas] long-distance costs between specific exchanges or throughout a contiguous geographic area." In regards to Internet access, one of the most important EAS programs creates "flat-rate calling zones that allow remote customers to reach an Internet service provider in a more populous area."

Issues of rural connectivity have been exacerbated by the COVID-19 pandemic and reveal how "poor management of the Universal Service Fund, which subsidizes phone and Internet access in rural areas, has meant some companies get the money without delivering on the promised numbers of households served or service quality." Therefore, one immediate fix to rural connectivity would be accountability within U.S.F programs and, arguably, more funding. While governments begin pondering questions such as, "is Internet access a right?", ideas on how to approach this issue fall along political party lines. Mainly, Democrats believe more government funding would help connect rural Americans while Republicans back new 5G mobile Internet technology to replace home Internet lines and solve access gaps. These arguments are very similar to political arguments about "electricity and phone service in the early 1900s."

The Federal Communications Commission (FCC) recently released an overview of initiatives based on "bridging the digital divide for all Americans." Some of these include:

- Launching the Rural Digital Opportunity Fund, which would direct up to $20.4 billion to expand broadband in unserved rural areas.
- Establishing the Digital Opportunity Data Collection, a new process for collecting fixed broadband data to improve mapping and better identify gaps in broadband coverage across the nation.
- Approving $950 million in funding to improve, expand, and harden communications networks in Puerto Rico and the U.S. Virgin Islands.
- Updating rules that govern access to utility poles and conduits, which can be a costly and time-consuming barrier to broadband deployment.
- Revising rules that needlessly delay or even stop companies from replacing copper with fiber and that delay discontinuance of technologies from the 1970s in favor of services using Internet Protocol (IP) technologies.

== See also ==
- Dial-up Internet access
- Broadband Internet access
- Hybrid Access Networks
- Coverage
- Flat fee
- Internet in the United States
- Open Access Network
- Rural electrification
- Rural free delivery
- ASTRA2Connect example of a rural satellite Internet system
- Starlink
- Satellite Internet
- Project Kuiper
- Satellite Internet constellation
