= MSC =

MSC, msc, or MSc may refer to:

== Computers ==
- Message Sequence Chart
- Microelectronics Support Centre, of British Rutherford Appleton Laboratory
- Microsoft C, a compiler package that was the forerunner of Microsoft Visual C++
- MIDI Show Control
- Mouse Systems Corporation, a former manufacturer of computer mouses
- MSC Malaysia, formerly known as Multimedia Super Corridor
- USB mass storage device class, abbreviated as USB MSC
- Mobile Switching Center, of a phone network
- Management saved console

== Corporations ==
- Managed service company, a British company structure
- Marine Services Company, shipping company in Tanzania
- Metric Systems Corporation
- Mediterranean Shipping Company
  - MSC Air Cargo, a cargo airline owned by Mediterranean Shipping Company
- MSC Industrial Direct, formerly Manhattan Supply Company
- MSC Software, simulation software company, formerly MacNeal-Schwendler Corporation
- Mabuhay Satellite Corporation, a defunct Philippine aerospace company

== Education ==
- Master of Science, abbreviated as MSc
  - Mastère en sciences, a French degree
- Memorial Student Center, Texas A&M University, United States
- Mesa State College, Colorado, United States
- Mount Saint Charles Academy, a catholic school in Rhode Island, United States
- Munsang College, Hong Kong
- Marinduque State College, Philippines, now Marinduque State University

== Military ==
- Medical Service Corps, of the U.S. military forces
- Military Sealift Command, of the U.S. Navy
- A US Navy hull classification symbol: Minesweeper, coastal (MSC)
- Military Staff Committee, a United Nations body
- Munich Security Conference, an annual international security conference

== Religion ==
- Marianites of Holy Cross
- Missionaries of the Sacred Heart

== Science ==
- Maryland Science Center
- Miles of Standard Cable, a former telephony unit of loss
- Manned Spacecraft Center, now Johnson Space Center
- Mathematics Subject Classification
- Messinian salinity crisis, a geological event during which the Mediterranean Sea dried up
- Meteorological Service of Canada

=== Biology ===
- Mechanosensitive channels
- Mesenchymal stem cell, a multipotent stromal cell
- MSC (gene), a human gene encoding the protein musculin
- Mammary secretory carcinoma, a rare form of the breast cancers

== Seafaring ==
- Maritime Safety Committee, a United Nations body
- Marine Safety Center, a United States Coast Guard unit
- Marine Stewardship Council, concerned with sustainable fishing
- Manchester Ship Canal, England
- Mediterranean Shipping Company, a container shipping company
  - MSC Cruises, a cruise line

== Sport ==
- Michael Schumacher and Mick Schumacher's abbreviation used in Formula 1
- Metro Suburban Conference, an athletic conference in Illinois, United States
- Mid-South Conference, an American athletic conference
- Mobile Legends: Bang Bang Mid Season Cup, an annual international MLBB esports tournament
  - Mobile Legends: Bang Bang Southeast Asia Cup, a former tournament for regional Southeast Asia during 2017-2023
- Mohammedan Sporting Club (Dhaka), Bangladesh
  - Mohammedan Sporting Club (Chittagong), a branch in Chittagong
- Mohammedan Sporting Club (Kolkata)
- Mombasa Sports Club, Kenya

== Other uses ==
- Air Cairo (ICAO code), an Egyptian airline
- Falcon Field (Arizona) (IATA code), an airport in Mesa, Arizona, United States
- Mail services center
- Manpower Services Commission, a British government agency, 1974–1987
- Matthews Southern Comfort, a country rock/folk rock band
- Meritorious Service Cross, a Canadian decoration bestowed by the Monarch
- Metropolitan Special Constabulary, London, England
- Motorcycle Stability Control, an ABS variant
- Movimiento Scout Católico (Catholic Scout Movement), Spain
- My Summer Car, a video game
- Sankaran Maninka language, an ISO 639-3 code
