= Frequency-hopping spread spectrum =

Radio signal transmission method

Frequency-hopping spread spectrum (FHSS) is a method of transmitting radio signals by rapidly changing the carrier frequency among many frequencies occupying a large spectral band. The changes are controlled by a code known to both transmitter and receiver. FHSS is used to avoid interference, to prevent eavesdropping, and to enable code-division multiple access (CDMA) communications.

The frequency band is divided into smaller sub-bands. Signals rapidly change ("hop") their carrier frequencies among the center frequencies of these sub-bands in a determined order. Interference at a specific frequency will affect the signal only during a short interval.

FHSS offers four main advantages over a fixed-frequency transmission:

1. FHSS signals are highly resistant to narrowband interference because the signal hops to a different frequency band.
2. Signals are difficult to intercept if the frequency-hopping pattern is not known.
3. Jamming is also difficult if the pattern is unknown; the signal can be jammed only for a single hopping period if the spreading sequence is unknown.
4. FHSS transmissions can share a frequency band with many types of conventional transmissions with minimal mutual interference. FHSS signals add minimal interference to narrowband communications, and vice versa.

== Usage ==
=== Military ===
Spread-spectrum signals are highly resistant to deliberate jamming unless the adversary has knowledge of the frequency-hopping pattern. Military radios generate the frequency-hopping pattern under the control of a secret Transmission Security Key (TRANSEC) that the sender and receiver share in advance. This key is generated by devices such as the KY-57 Speech Security Equipment. United States military radios that use frequency hopping include the JTIDS/MIDS family, the HAVE QUICK Aeronautical Mobile communications system, and the SINCGARS Combat Net Radio, Link-16.

=== Civilian ===
In the US, since the Federal Communications Commission (FCC) amended rules to allow FHSS systems in the unregulated 2.4 GHz band, many consumer devices in that band have employed various FHSS modes. eFCC CFR 47 part 15.247 covers the regulations in the US for 902–928 MHz, 2400–2483.5 MHz, and 5725–5850 MHz bands, and the requirements for frequency hopping.

Some walkie-talkies that employ FHSS technology have been developed for unlicensed use on the 900 MHz band. FHSS technology is also used in many hobby transmitters and receivers used for radio-controlled model cars, airplanes, and drones. A type of multiple access is achieved allowing hundreds of transmitter/receiver pairs to be operated simultaneously on the same band, in contrast to previous FM or AM radio-controlled systems that had limited simultaneous channels.

== Technical considerations ==
The overall bandwidth required for frequency hopping is much wider than that required to transmit the same information using only one carrier frequency. But because transmission occurs only on a small portion of this bandwidth at any given time, the instantaneous interference bandwidth is really the same. While providing no extra protection against wideband thermal noise, the frequency-hopping approach reduces the degradation caused by narrowband interference sources.

One of the challenges of frequency-hopping systems is to synchronize the transmitter and receiver. One approach is to have a guarantee that the transmitter will use all the channels in a fixed period of time. The receiver can then find the transmitter by picking a random channel and listening for valid data on that channel. The transmitter's data is identified by a special sequence of data that is unlikely to occur over the segment of data for this channel, and the segment can also have a checksum for integrity checking and further identification. The transmitter and receiver can use fixed tables of frequency-hopping patterns, so that once synchronized they can maintain communication by following the table.

In the US, FCC part 15 on unlicensed spread spectrum systems in the 902–928 MHz and 2.4 GHz bands permits more power than is allowed for non-spread-spectrum systems. Both FHSS and direct-sequence spread-spectrum (DSSS) systems can transmit at 1 watt, a thousandfold increase from the 1 milliwatt limit on non-spread-spectrum systems. The FCC also prescribes a minimum number of frequency channels and a maximum dwell time for each channel.

== Origins ==
In 1899, Guglielmo Marconi experimented with frequency-selective reception in an attempt to minimise interference.

The earliest mentions of frequency hopping in open literature are in US patent 725,605, awarded to Nikola Tesla on March 17, 1903, and in radio pioneer Jonathan Zenneck's book Wireless Telegraphy (German, 1908, English translation McGraw Hill, 1915), (Note: "Furthermore the apparatus can be so arranged that the wave-length is easily and rapidly changed and then vary the wave-length in accordance with a prearranged program, perhaps automatically. (This method was adopted by the Telefunken Co. at one time.)" Zenneck describes additional methods of security, including synchronizing receiving to only a subset of transmission.) although Zenneck writes that Telefunken had already tried it. Nikola Tesla doesn't mention the phrase "frequency hopping" directly, but certainly alludes to it. Entitled Method of Signaling, the patent describes a system that would enable radio communication without any danger of the signals or messages being disturbed, intercepted, interfered with in any way.

The German military made limited use of frequency hopping for communication between fixed command points in World War I to prevent eavesdropping by British forces, who did not have the technology to follow the sequence. Jonathan Zenneck's book Wireless Telegraphy was originally published in German in 1908, but was translated into English in 1915 as the enemy started using frequency hopping on the front line.

In 1920, Otto B. Blackwell, De Loss K. Martin, and Gilbert S. Vernam filed a patent application for a "Secrecy Communication System", granted as U.S. Patent 1,598,673 in 1926. This patent described a method of transmitting signals on multiple frequencies in a random manner for secrecy, anticipating key features of later frequency hopping systems.

A Polish engineer and inventor, Leonard Danilewicz, claimed to have suggested the concept of frequency hopping in 1929 to the Polish General Staff, but it was rejected.

In 1932, U.S. patent 1,869,659 was awarded to Willem Broertjes, named "Method of maintaining secrecy in the transmission of wireless telegraphic messages", which describes a system where "messages are transmitted by means of a group of frequencies... known to the sender and receiver alone, and alternated at will during transmission of the messages".

During World War II, the US Army Signal Corps was inventing a communication system called SIGSALY, which incorporated spread spectrum in a single frequency context. However, SIGSALY was a top-secret communications system, so its existence was not known until the 1980s.

In 1942, actress Hedy Lamarr and composer George Antheil received U.S. patent 2,292,387 for their "Secret Communications System", an early version of frequency hopping using a piano-roll to switch among 88 frequencies to make radio-guided torpedoes harder for enemies to detect or jam. They then donated the patent to the U.S. Navy.

Frequency-hopping ideas may have been rediscovered in the 1950s during patent searches when private companies were independently developing direct-sequence Code Division Multiple Access, a non-frequency-hopping form of spread-spectrum. In 1957, engineers at Sylvania Electronic Systems Division adopted a similar idea, using the recently invented transistor instead of Lamarr's and Antheil's clockwork technology. In 1962, the US Navy utilized Sylvania Electronic Systems Division's work during the Cuban Missile Crisis.

A practical application of frequency hopping was developed by Ray Zinn, co-founder of Micrel Corporation. Zinn developed a method allowing radio devices to operate without the need to synchronize a receiver with a transmitter. Using frequency hopping and sweep modes, Zinn's method is primarily applied in low data rate wireless applications such as utility metering, machine and equipment monitoring and metering, and remote control. In 2006 Zinn received U.S. patent 6,996,399 for his "Wireless device and method using frequency hopping and sweep modes."

== Variations ==
Adaptive frequency-hopping spread spectrum (AFH) as used in Bluetooth improves resistance to radio frequency interference by avoiding crowded frequencies in the hopping sequence. This sort of adaptive transmission is easier to implement with FHSS than with DSSS.

The key idea behind AFH is to use only the "good" frequencies and avoid the "bad" ones—those experiencing frequency selective fading, those on which a third party is trying to communicate, or those being actively jammed. Therefore, AFH should be complemented by a mechanism for detecting good and bad channels.

But if the radio frequency interference is itself dynamic, then AFH's strategy of "bad channel removal" may not work well. For example, if there are several colocated frequency-hopping networks (as Bluetooth Piconet), they are mutually interfering and AFH's strategy fails to avoid this interference.

The problem of dynamic interference, gradual reduction of available hopping channels and backward compatibility with legacy Bluetooth devices was resolved in version 1.2 of the Bluetooth Standard (2003). Such a situation can often happen in the scenarios that use unlicensed spectrum.

In addition, dynamic radio frequency interference is expected to occur in the scenarios related to cognitive radio, where the networks and the devices should exhibit frequency-agile operation.

Chirp modulation can be seen as a form of frequency-hopping that simply scans through the available frequencies in consecutive order to communicate.

Frequency hopping can be superimposed on other modulations or waveforms to enhance the system performance.

== See also ==
- Dynamic frequency hopping
- List of multiple discoveries
- Maximum length sequence
- Orthogonal frequency-division multiplexing
- Radio-frequency sweep

== Bibliography ==
- Tony Rothman (Jan–Feb 2019). "Random Paths to Frequency Hopping". American Scientist. 107 (1): 46. doi:10.1511/2019.107.1.46.
- Władysław Kozaczuk (1984). Christopher Kasparek (ed.). Enigma: How the German Machine Cipher Was Broken, and How It Was Read by the Allies in World War Two. Translated by Christopher Kasparek. Frederick, MD: University Publications of America. ISBN 0-89093-547-5.
