= Open communication =

In business, open communication (or open access to communication resources) is the ability of anyone, on equal conditions with a transparent relation between cost and pricing, to get access to and share communication resources on one level to provide value added services on another level in a layered communication system architecture. Simply put, open access plans are to deregulate oligarchy of telecom operators in a bid to give consumers more choices for equipment, services and service vendors or carriers. It will also provide some breathing room for the controversial net neutrality that has been the central issue between mobile carriers, like AT&T, Verizon and Sprint Nextel, and web media moguls, like eBay, Amazon.com and Google. True open communication is where employees are encouraged to share their thoughts and concerns, both good and bad, without the worry of retaliation from management when the feedback is bad.

== Socioeconomic impact ==
The concept of Open Access to Communication Resources is central in the ongoing transformation of the communication market from a "vertically integrated" market with a few operators owning and operating everything between the physical medium and the end-user, to an "open horizontal market" with an abundance of actors operating on different levels and providing value added services on top of each other.

Open Access is also a broad approach to policy and regulatory issues that starts from the question: what do we want to bring about outside of purely industry sector concerns? It places an emphasis on empowering citizens, getting the best from public and private sector contributions and encouraging local innovation, economic growth and investment.

The objective is to alter the outcomes delivered by the policy and regulatory framework rather than adjusting its technical rules. Since the advent of the World Wide Web (WWW) in the early 1990s and subsequent dot-com cycles, web culture has introduced decentralization, creating a user-centric community marked by diversity, practicality, voluntarism, and egalitarianism.

== Open communication in the workplace ==
Aside from the definition of open communication, for one to thoroughly understand the concept of open communication, there needs to be a clear distinction and understanding of the comparison between both open and closed communication and why each is better suited for different environments. In a work environment where teamwork and leadership collectively make choices and every person’s opinions and concerns are valued, open communication is best suited because according to communication experts, this democratic type of communication ensures all stakeholders participate in the decision making and problem solving processes." In comparison, closed communication is a non-democratic style of work environment "because it limits access to important information for employees, workers, and subordinates."

Among other environments, most commonly, open communication is extremely important in the workplace. Without open communication where colleagues speak both honestly and freely, miscommunication or altercations can happen as a result. Open Communication can prevent these events from happening because: "It expresses the job that needs to be done, employees learn how to be accountable, the team forms stronger relationships, and organizational problems stop worsening."

Using open communication in the workplace promotes an abundance of benefits for an effective work environment. Some of these benefits include: productivity improvement, improvement of employee confidence, reduction of cultural gaps between a diverse staff, and reason for employees to remain loyal to their organization.

The use of open communication can be beneficial to workplace efficacy, however maintaining open communication is the process that sustains such workplace efficacy that leaders and/or managers are heavily relied on for. Some ways to maintain open communication in the workplace as a leader/manager is to "be transparent, ask employees for feedback, demonstrate respect for employees, tackle problems head-on, get to know others on a personal level, and be approachable."

Ways of communicating openly can vary. Some examples of open communication that promote efficacy and productivity in the workplace are "around-the-clock clear communication channels, weekly one-on-one meetings, monthly or quarterly staff meetings, annual reviews, anonymous surveys, postmortem debriefs, informal social outings, email communications, and employee exit interviews."

== See also ==
- Open Access Network
- 2008 United States wireless spectrum auction
- Unbundled Access
- Wireless community network
