= Super Wi-Fi =

Performance enhanced wireless network

Super Wi-Fi refers to IEEE 802.11g/n/ac/ax Wi-Fi implementations over unlicensed 2.4 and 5 GHz Wi-Fi bands but with performance enhancements for antenna control, multiple path beam selection, advance control for best path, and applied intelligence for load balancing giving it bi-directional connectivity range for standard wifi enabled devices over distances of up to 1,700 meters. Hong Kong–based Altai Technologies developed and patented Super Wi-Fi technology and manufacturers a product line of base stations and access points deployed extensively around the world beginning in 2007. Due to its extended range and advanced interference mitigation, Super Wi-Fi is primarily used for expansive outdoor and heavy industrial use cases. Krysp Wireless, LLC is Altai Technologies' Master Distributor for North America focused on the sale and distribution of Super Wi-Fi products for large enterprises, WISPs and municipal deployments. Altai's Super Wi-Fi technology should not be confused with the FCC's use of the term relating to proposed plans announced in 2012 for using TV white space spectrum to support delivery of long range internet access.

== History ==
Super Wi-Fi is a term originally coined by the United States Federal Communications Commission (FCC) to describe a wireless networking proposal which the FCC plans to use for the creation of longer-distance wireless Internet access. The use of the trademark "Wi-Fi" in the name has been criticized because it is neither based on Wi-Fi technology nor endorsed by the Wi-Fi Alliance. A trade show has also been called the "Super WiFi Summit" (without hyphen).

Various standards such as IEEE 802.22 and IEEE 802.11af have been proposed for this concept. The term "White-Fi" has also been used to indicate the use of white space for IEEE 802.11af.

== Technology ==
Altai Technologies' Super Wi-Fi leverages a dynamic use of unlicensed 2.4 and 5 GHz bands to seamlessly migrate nomadic device connections from one band to the other depending on their distance from the Super Wi-Fi base station/access point. This dynamic use of both unlicensed bands combined with patented throughput optimization and interference mitigation is what supports Super Wi-Fi's extended range. Conversely, The FCC's Super Wi-Fi proposal is a network backhaul solution that uses the lower-frequency white spaces between television channel frequencies. These lower frequencies allow the signal to travel further and penetrate walls better than the higher frequencies previously used. The FCC's plan was to allow those white space frequencies to be used for free, as happens with shorter-range Wi-Fi and Bluetooth. However, due to concerns of interference to broadcast, Super Wi-Fi devices cannot access the TV spectrum at will. The FCC has made mandatory the utilization of a TV white space database (also referred to as a geolocation database), which must be accessed by Super Wi-Fi devices before the latter gain access to the VHF-UHF spectrum. The white space database evaluates the potential for interference to broadcast and either grants or denies access of Super Wi-Fi devices to the VHF-UHF spectrum. Continuing research exists evaluating the potential for Super Wi-Fi Networks for coverage and performance.

== Deployments ==
Altai Technologies' Super Wi-Fi deployment use cases around the world include container ports, heavy industrial complexes, campus environments, mining operations, agriculture and airports among others. Proof of concept deployments for the FCC's Super Wi-Fi initiative leveraging TV white space include Rice University, in partnership with the nonprofit organization Technology For All, installed the first residential deployment of Super Wi-Fi in east Houston in April 2011. The network uses white spaces for backhaul and provides access to clients using 2.4 GHz Wi-Fi. The United States' first public Super Wi-Fi network was deployed in Wilmington, North Carolina, on January 26, 2012. Florida-based company Spectrum Bridge launched a network for public use with access at Hugh MacRae park. West Virginia University launched the first campus Super Wi-Fi network on July 9, 2013.

Currently, Microsoft is using TV Whitespaces to provide Super Wi-Fi connectivity in select regions across Africa, Asia, North America, and South America. This is after running successful trials back in 2012 in countries such as Belgium, Kenya, Switzerland, Singapore, the United Kingdom, the United States, and Uruguay. As of 2021, Microsoft runs the service under Project Mawingu in Microsoft 4Afrika to provide low-cost internet access within rural communities in the African continent. The countries served include the likes of Kenya, Namibia, Tanzania, South Africa, Ghana and Botswana.

== See also ==
- Li-Fi
