= D block =

D block, Block D, or variants, may refer to:

- d-block, a division of the periodic table of elements
- D-Block Records, a hip-hop record label
- D-Block at Alcatraz Federal Penitentiary
- Block D, a Soviet rocket stage
- Block D, a portion of the United States 2008 wireless spectrum auction that was not sold during the auction
