= White space Internet =

Broadband Internet access that uses a part of the radio spectrum known as white spaces

White space Internet uses a part of the radio spectrum known as white spaces. The frequency range is created when there are gaps between the coverage areas of television channels. The spaces can provide broadband internet access that is similar to that of 4G mobile.

== Wilmington, North Carolina ==
In a 2012 test of the technology, the city of Wilmington, North Carolina implemented technology utilizing the white space systems "to connect the city's infrastructure, allowing public officials to remotely turn lights on and off in parks, provide public wireless broadband to certain areas of the city, and monitor water levels."

The initial tests of this internet showed that white space signals travel further and with less interference than Wi-Fi and Bluetooth. White space can help to alleviate some of the problems that are occurring with networks being over crowded. In 2013 the system was still in use.

== Carlson Wireless Technologies ==
Carlson Wireless Technologies users are utilizing white space in order to access broadband internet. Carlson Wireless Technologies has been able to conduct research that has proven white space internet to cover around 10 kilometers in diameter, which covers 100 times further than WI-Fi.

Also, white space is considered non-line-of-sight (NLOS). It differs from microwave links that need line-of-sight. The white space works with the lower-frequency UHF signals in order to connect between devices. NLOS allows white space to cover areas that have obstacles with limited issue.

== Wireless Reach ==
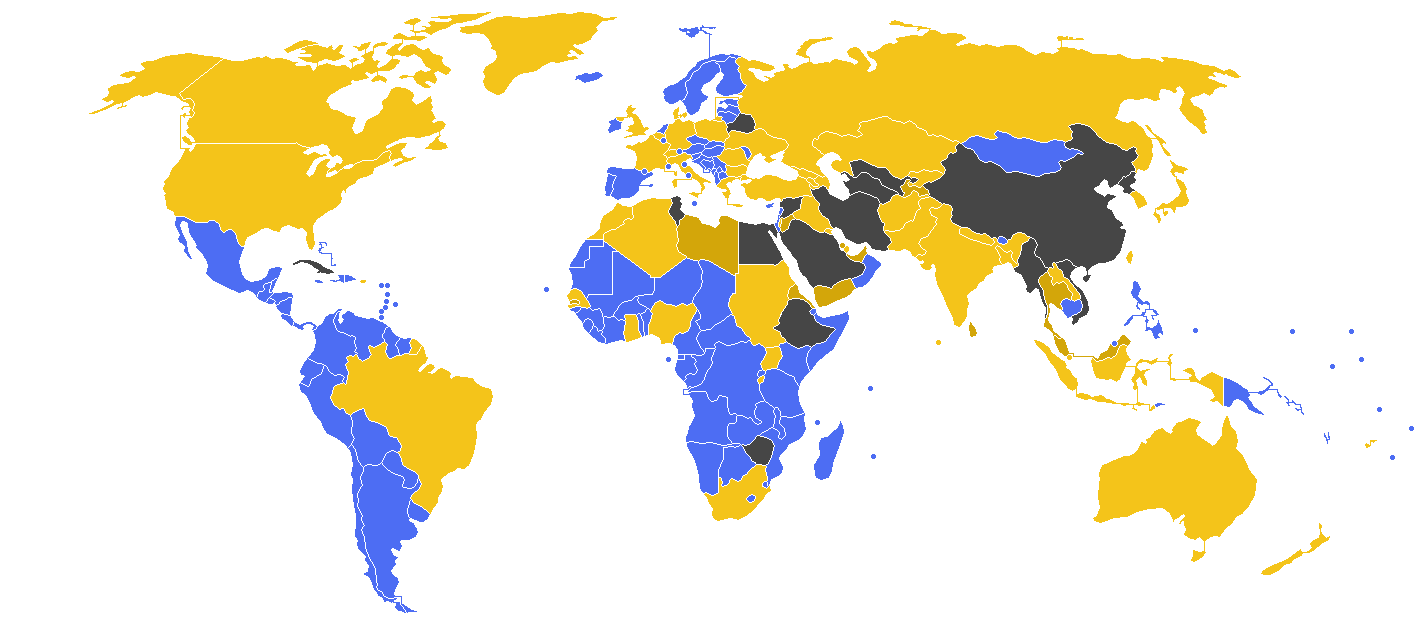
Areas where it is difficult to connect to the Internet

White space technology has been suggested for several countries. Microsoft has white space databases, and is advancing white space technology to Jamaica, Namibia, Philippines, Tanzania, Taiwan, Colombia, United Kingdom, and the United States. Also, Google has decided to push white space technology to Cape Town, South Africa.

An argument against white space Internet is that it uses a radio frequency range commonly used for television, and is not Super Wi-Fi.

== See also ==
- White spaces (database)
- White spaces (radio)
