= Dynamic frequency hopping =

One of the key challenges of the cognitive radio based wireless networks, such as IEEE 802.22 wireless regional area networks (WRAN), is to address two apparently conflicting requirements: assuring Quality of Services (QoS) satisfaction for services provided by the cognitive radio networks, while providing reliable spectrum sensing for guaranteeing licensed user protection. To perform reliable sensing, in the basic operation mode on a single frequency band (the so-called "listenbefore-talk" mode) one has to allocate Quiet Times, in which no data transmission is permitted. Such periodic interruption of data transmission could impair the QoS of cognitive radio systems.

This issue is addressed by an alternative operation mode proposed in IEEE 802.22 called Dynamic Frequency Hopping (DFH) where data transmission of the WRAN systems are performed in parallel with spectrum sensing without any interruption.
