= Spectrum auction =

Government auction of radio spectrum

A spectrum auction is a process whereby a government uses an auction system to sell the rights to transmit signals over specific bands of the electromagnetic spectrum and to assign scarce spectrum resources. Depending on the specific auction format used, a spectrum auction can last from a single day to several months from the opening bid to the final winning bid. With a well-designed auction, resources are allocated efficiently to the parties that value them the most, the government securing revenue in the process. Spectrum auctions are a step toward market-based spectrum management and privatization of public airwaves, and are a way for governments to allocate scarce resources.

== Innovation ==
In the past decade, telecommunications has turned into a highly competitive industry where companies are competing to buy valuable spectrum. This competition has been triggered by technological advancements, privatization, and liberalization. Mobile communication in particular has made many transitions since 2000, mobile technology has moved from second generation (2G) to third generation (3G) to fourth generation (4G) and is now in transition to fifth generation (5G) technology.

With more providers in the mobile industry, the competition during spectrum auctions has increased due to more demand from consumers. When the United States made the transition in June 2009 from analog to digital broadcast television signals, the valuable 700 MHz spectrum became available because it was no longer being used by analog TV signals. In 2007, search giant Google announced that they would be entering the mobile business with their highly popular Android operating system and plans for a mobile broadband system. Google said that they planned to bid for the "C" block of the spectrum auction which correspond to channels 54, 55, and 59 of the lower 700 MHz spectrum and channels 60, 61, 65, and 66 of the upper spectrum 700 MHz which are normally used to construct nationwide broadband services. Around the time of Google's announcement, AT&T and Verizon also announced plans to enter the spectrum auction in order to purchase "C" block spectrum.

== Merits ==
=== Advantages ===
- An auction is more transparent, and gives rise to less political controversy when compared to other allocation mechanisms, since there is no room for subjectivity in assessing whether an undertaking accomplishes criteria for allocation (unlike a beauty contest or the direct allocation of a license).
- Auctions usually raise important sums of money provided there is competition among many bidders.

=== Disadvantages ===
Despite the apparent success of spectrum auctions, important disadvantages limiting efficiency and revenues are demand reduction and collusive bidding. The information and flexibility in the process of auction can be used to reduce auction prices by tacit collusion. When bidder competition is weak and one bidder holds an apparent advantage to win the auction for specific licenses, other bidders will often choose not to bid for higher prices, hence reducing the final revenue generated by the auction. In this case, the auction is best thought of as a negotiation among the bidders, who agree on who should win the auction for each discrete bit of spectrum. The foregoing notwithstanding, due to the complicated structure of spectrum auctions, it is not easy to identify collusive from non-collusive bidding, although simple analyses of bid behavior can provide an important basis for recommended changes to the rules and structure of the auctions.

== Countries ==
=== Canada ===
As telecommunications is an area of federal jurisdiction, Innovation, Science and Economic Development Canada (ISED; formerly Industry Canada) holds nationwide spectrum auctions on behalf of the Canadian federal government. As per existing policy frameworks and statutes like the Competition Act, auctions are designed to encourage competition among telecom companies, and to not concentrate too much regional or economic power in the hands of single or a handful of firms. As such, auctions are generally set up to favour smaller telecom providers, such as setting aside certain wavelengths that the "Big Three" firms—Bell, Rogers and TELUS—are precluded from bidding on, or reserving certain valuable wavelengths (e.g. those that can more easily penetrate elevators or tunnels) for small firms.

Canada held its first spectrum auction in 1999, for Broadband Wireless Access (BWA) spectrum in the 24 GHz and 38 GHz bands.

In May 2008, ISED commenced an auction for 105 MHz of spectrum with 40 MHz reserved for new entrants. The auction concluded on July 23, 2008, after 331 rounds and raised $4.25 billion.

In August 2011, Canada made the switch from analog to digital television, freeing up spectrum in the 700 MHz band for other uses. In February 2014, the country auctioned additional spectrum in the 700 MHz and 2500 MHz bands to the four major telecommunications players in the country and raised over $5.3 billion. Christian Paradis, Minister of Industry at the time, was quoted as hoping that the auctioning of these two bands (sometimes referred to as "prime location") would help foster more competition in the telecom sector, particularly the wireless sector, where Canada is just beginning to feel the effects of competition from new wireless companies from the 2008 auction.

In order to maximize compatibility and prevent cross-border interference, the FCC in the United States (America's broadcast regulator) and ISED agreed on August 14, 2015, to coordinate their frequencies in their border zone.

=== Germany ===
From 2000 to 2007–31 to 2000-08-18, the German government conducted an auction for 12 frequency blocks for the new UMTS mobile telephony standard. The total of the bids exceeded expectations by reaching the staggering amount of DEM 98.8 billions (EUR 50.8 billions). (See de:Versteigerung der UMTS-Lizenzen in Deutschland)

In 2010, the highest bid in the German spectrum auction was 1,213 Million Euros for two blocks in the 800 MHz band

=== India ===
India was among the early adopters of spectrum auctions beginning auctions in 1991. Despite the early start in auctions, services have been slow to roll out caused by unforeseen problems with the design and rules of the auction. Potential service providers were required to seek foreign partners, as the Department of Telecom (DoT) felt that no Indian company alone had the financial means to enter the industry. Bidding for all licenses required a two-stage screening process. Auctions did occur in 2015, where the government has obtained a revenue of ₹ 110,000 crore from spectrum allocation.

=== Ireland ===
On 2012-11-15 the Commission for Communications Regulation (ComReg) announced the results of its multi-band spectrum auction (primarily for 4G (LTE)). This auction awarded spectrum rights of use in the 800 MHz, 900 MHz and 1800 MHz bands in Ireland from 2013 to 2030. The winners of spectrum were 3, Meteor, O_{2} Ireland and Vodafone. All of the winning bidders in the auction have indicated that they intend to move rapidly to deploy advanced services.

Licences were issued in respect of two time slices, the first ending contemporaneously with the expiry of the last existing licence in the 900 MHz band and close in time to the expiry of existing licences in the 1800 MHz band.

The auction consisted of:

- a main stage, in which bidders bid for packages of lots, this comprised:
  - combinatorial clock rounds; followed by
  - a combinatorial sealed bid round; and
  - winner and price determination using opportunity cost pricing;
- an assignment stage, in which bidders bid for specific frequency assignments, this comprised:
  - a sealed bid assignment round; and
  - a negotiation phase in which bidders were permitted to negotiate altered frequency assignments. No change resulted from the negotiation phase.

The existing licences in the 900 MHz and 1800 MHz bands were restricted to GSM use only. As the licences to be issued on foot of the auction are liberalised licences permitting use of the spectrum for UMTS, 4G and other technologies, existing licensees were permitted to bid to win their existing spectrum holdings on a liberalised basis and a rebate is payable in respect of the residual value of existing licences where this was done.

=== New Zealand ===
New Zealand's 1989 Radiocommunications Act of 1989 authorized Radio Spectrum Management (RSM) to create private property rights for spectrum and to use market-driven allocation mechanisms for the granting of these newly created licenses. Initially, spectrum licenses were sold using a tender system, but the first New Zealand spectrum auction was held in 1996, "making New Zealand the first country to sell rights to use spectrum in this way". An internet-based computer system was developed for the second auction, held in 1998.

=== Slovakia ===
During the year 2013 Telecommunications Regulatory Authority of the Slovak Republic concluded a CCA electronic auction for spectrum licences from the 800 MHz, 1800 MHz and 2600 MHz frequency bands. These frequencies are reserved for operation of 4G networks (especially LTE technology). The auction was accompanied by strict information embargo. Neither the public nor the auctioneers did not know who are the auctioneers nor how many auctioneers participates in the auction. During the primary clock rounds the auctioneers knew only a limited aggregate demand at the end of auction day.

Before the auction the Slovak Republic executed the process of releasing the 790–862 MHz frequency band (e.g. digital television transition), defined as a digital dividend for broadband networks to provide electronic telecommunication services. The process of releasing formed a free range of 2 x 30 MHz, which after splitting into 6 blocks (each of size 2 x 5 MHz) was the subject of the auction. The maximum frequency spectrum that could be assigned to one company on the 800 MHz band was 2 x 10 MHz. Reserve price for each block was set at EUR 19 million.

Most frequencies from the 1800 MHz band had been already used to provide public electronic communication services in the Slovak republic. Before the auction three existing national mobile operators had leased 2 x 15.2 MHz each. Remaining fragments of frequencies with a total size of 2 x 20.4 MHz became the subject of the auction. These fragments ranged from 2 x 0.4 MHz to 2 x 10.6 MHz. The Authority created a total of 8 blocks in 7 categories with the largest blocks of 2 x 5 MHz. The reserve price ranged from EUR 200,000 to EUR 2,200,000 per block. The maximum frequency spectrum that could be assigned to one company on the 1800 MHz band was 2 x 20 MHz, thus existing mobile operators could gain only 2 x 4.8 MHz each.

According to ECC decision 2600 MHz band was split into two categories: FDD with 14 blocks of 2 x 5 MHz and TDD with 10 blocks of 1 x 5 MHz each. Reserve price was set at EUR 1.1 million per FDD block and EUR 400,000 per TDD block. In 2600 MHz frequency range no operator had leased the spectrum before the auction. The maximum frequency spectrum that could be assigned to one company on the 2600 MHz band was not limited.

Most of the frequencies were sold to the three existing national providers (Orange, Slovak Telekom, Telefónica Slovakia). The auction brought also a new mobile operator, company called Swan. Total revenue of auction has been EUR 163.9 million that is 15% above the sum of reserve prices. All of the auctioned blocks were sold. The sold licences are valid till 2028. Successful auctioneers undertook the obligation to enter into a contract with any parties interested in national roaming or wholesale offer.

=== Sweden ===
On 2008-05-08 the Swedish Post and Telecom Authority (PTS) concluded an electronic 16-day simultaneous multiple-round ascending auction for nine 15-year 4G-licenses; for a total bandwidth of 190 MHz in the 2.6 GHz band. The total required minimum bids were SEK 50 million, but the total winning bids were SEK 2,099,450,000 (approx US$38.60 per inhabitant).

=== United Kingdom ===
2000

In 2000, the Radiocommunications Agency of the UK government (now Ofcom) raised £22.5 billion (EUR 36.9 billion (2000)) from an auction of five licences for radio spectrum to support the 3G mobile telephony standard. The auction was conducted in a simultaneous ascending auction, similar to the US format with a slight deviation. In the UK's version of the simultaneous individual auction, each high bidder is only allowed to win one of the five auctions whereas in the US, many regions have multiple licences which multiple bidders can win. After the auction in the UK, a severe recession in the telecom development industry was seen.

2013

The 4G auction took place in 2013. The results were:

Winning bidder	Spectrum won	Base price
Everything Everywhere Ltd	2 x 5 MHz of 800 MHz and 2 x 35 MHz of 2.6 GHz	£588,876,000
Hutchison 3G UK Ltd	2 x 5 MHz of 800 MHz	£225,000,000
Niche Spectrum Ventures Ltd (a subsidiary of BT Group plc)	2 x 15 MHz of 2.6 GHz and 1 x 25 MHz of 2.6 GHz (unpaired)	£186,476,000
Telefonica UK Ltd	2 x 10 MHz of 800 MHz (coverage obligation lot)	£550,000,000
Vodafone Ltd	2 x 10 MHz of 800 MHz; 2 x 20 MHz of 2.6 GHz; 1 x 25 MHz of 2.6 GHz (unpaired)	£790,761,000
Total		£2,341,113,000

MLL Telecom Ltd HKT (UK) Company Ltd was not a winning bidder.

2018

On 13 April 2018, the UK telecoms regulator, Ofcom, announced the results of a spectrum auction of the 2.3 GHz band (for improved 4G capacity) and the 3.4 GHz band for future 5G mobile services. The results are:

- Airspan Spectrum Holdings Limited has not won spectrum in either band
- EE has won 40 MHz of 3.4 GHz spectrum at a cost of £303,594,000
- Hutchison 3G UK Limited has won 20 MHz of 3.4 GHz spectrum at a cost of £164,429,000
- Telefónica UK Limited has won all 40 MHz of 2.3 GHz spectrum available, at a cost of £205,896,000; and 40 MHz of 3.4 GHz spectrum at a cost of £317,720,000
- Vodafone Limited has won 50 MHz of 3.4 GHz spectrum at a cost of £378,240,000

The total of £1,369,879,000 will be paid to HM Treasury.

=== United States ===
In the United States, the Federal Communications Commission (FCC) conducts auctions of licenses for electromagnetic spectrum. The FCC has been conducting competitive auctions since 1994 rather than assigning spectra through comparative hearings under which the specific merits of each applicant is litigated, or through lotteries. Since July 1994, the FCC has conducted 87 spectrum auctions, which raised over $60 billion for the U.S. Treasury (not all of which has been collected). When initially planning and designing the spectrum auction, major telephone companies and the federal government relied on the input of various theorists including Paul Milgrom, Charles Plott, Barry Nalebuff, Preston McAfee, and John McMillan among others. The auctions assigned thousands of licenses to hundreds of licensees. The auction approach is widely emulated throughout the world. To be considered a qualified [bidder] by the commission, companies or individuals have to submit an application and an upfront downpayment. FCC auctions are conducted electronically and are accessible over the Internet. Bidders can follow the progress of an auction and view the results of each round.

==== Forms ====
The FCC auctions have used a Simultaneous Multiple Round Auction (SMRA, also referred to as the Simultaneous Ascending Auction) in which groups of related licenses are auctioned simultaneously over many rounds of bidding. At the start of each round, bidders simultaneously make sealed bids for any licenses in which they are interested. When the bidding for the round has concluded, round results are posted, which include the identities of the new bids and bidders along with the standing high bid and the corresponding bidder. The initial standing high bid at the start of an auction is zero ($0) and the corresponding bidder is the auctioneer. As the auction progresses, the standing high bid changes to highest new bid and the corresponding bidder is the person who makes said bid. In addition to posting the round results, minimum bids for the next round are also posted. A minimum bid is computed from taking the standard high bid and adding a predetermined bid increment, such as 5% or 10%. For an auction to come to a close there are several different options. McAfee, suggested that auctions should come to a close after a predetermined number of rounds, in which the license receives no new bids. Wilson and Paul Milgrom of Stanford University proposed that all auctions should end simultaneously, when there is no new bid on a license. To date, the latter is used in the spectrum auctions.

==== Goals ====
The US Congress set multiple goals for FCC when spectrum auction was first launched: "In designing auctions for spectrum licenses, the FCC is required by law to meet multiple goals and not focus simply on maximizing receipts. Those goals include ensuring efficient use of the spectrum, promoting economic opportunity and competition, avoiding excessive concentration of licenses, preventing the unjust enrichment of any party, and fostering the rapid deployment of new services, as well as recovering for the public a portion of the value of the spectrum."

==== History ====
In certain cases, the FCC has imposed conditions on specific blocks of spectrum being auctioned. In the 2007 700 MHz auction, the FCC required the winning bidder of the C Block to comply with open platform conditions, "allow[ing] customers, device manufacturers, third-party application developers, and others to use or develop the devices and applications of their choice, subject to certain conditions".

The FCC held the 700 MHz band spectrum auction on July 19, 2011. The auction, entitled "auction 92" featured 16 licenses which were left over from auction 73, as either unsold or not paid for. Licenses available were from block A and B of the spectrum and included:

Block	Frequency (MHz)
A	698-704 & 728-734
B	704-710 & 734-740

In mid 2015, the FCC began the 600 MHz incentive auction. This spectrum is "valuable" because of "high quality wireless airwaves which penetrate walls" and work better over long-distance than higher frequency spectra. The FCC said that a portion will be reserved for smaller carriers. AT&T and Verizon control the majority of the high quality spectrum less than 1 Gigahertz, while Sprint and T-Mobile hold much less.

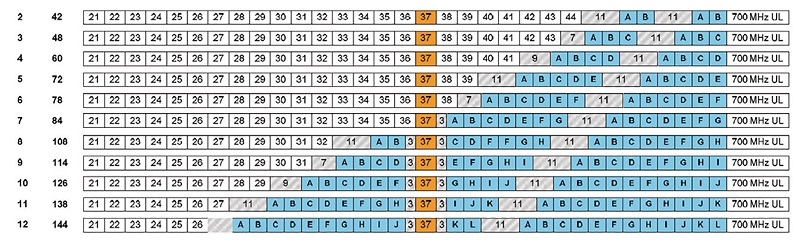
The Federal Communications Commission's estimates on how many channels will be re-allocated from television broadcasts to mobile phones. Option 7 (84 MHz, or everything above UHF 37) was the ultimate outcome.

Broadcasters and mobile phone companies agreed on re-allocating 84 MHz of UHF TV broadcast spectrum, which is everything above UHF Channel 37. Shown in the image to the right, the UHF band will be re-allocated to cell phones using 5-MHz-wide uplink and downlink blocks, with guard bands of varying width (3 MHz between UHF 37 and Uplink Block A and 11 MHz between Uplink Block G and Downlink Block A) to protect from adjacent-channel interference. Upon conclusion of the auction, television stations that choose to not accept a monetary offer to go off the air permanently (that is, to stay on the air) will have 39 months to migrate to a new, lower frequency (either on the UHF band, or the VHF-High or VHF-Low bands). If there are delays with preparing their broadcast towers for the new channel frequency, stations are eligible for a single 180-day (six-month) extension (similar to a Silent STA), but they will have to cease broadcasts on their auction channel until they move.

In order to maximize compatibility and prevent cross-border interference, the FCC and Industry Canada (Canada's broadcast regulator) agreed on August 14, 2015, to coordinate their frequencies in their border zone.

On April 13, 2017, the FCC released the results of the 600 MHz incentive auction. T-Mobile US was the largest bidder and obtained nationwide low-band spectrum licenses for the first time in their history, with Dish Network, Comcast, and AT&T also gaining licenses in parts of the country. Verizon, who participated in the auction, ultimately purchased no licenses. Lawrence Chu, an advisor to the FCC during the bidding process, considered the auction a success while admitting that "there will be some people disappointed on the broadcaster side."

On November 14, 2018, the Federal Communications Commission (FCC) began auctioning spectrum for 5G services for the first time. Bidding opened for spectrum in the 28 GHz band, with a total of a little more than 3,000 country-based licenses up for grabs, and will be followed by an auction of spectrum in the 24 GHz band. In total the FCC hopes to auction off around 6,000 licenses. FCC Chairman Ajit Pai said the auction constituted "more spectrum than is currently used for terrestrial mobile broadband by all wireless service providers combined.” The auction covered about a quarter of the U.S. airwaves. Cox Communications was the only major U.S. cable operator to enter into the FCC's first auction of spectrum devoted to next-generation 5G services, with Comcast, Charter Communications and Altice USA not filing for the auctions. Along with Cox Communications, Dish Network, AT&T, Verizon, T-Mobile, Windstream and other telecom companies bid for licenses in the 24 GHz auction. Dish Network, AT&T, Verizon, T-Mobile, Windstream and Frontier Communications were among the companies bidding for 28 GHz licenses in the FCC's so-called “millimeter-wave” auction.

==== Auction structure ====
Each spectrum auction has established rules and regulations, as outlined by the FCC. For example, the FCC published a Public Notice establishing procedures for their first 5G Spectrum Auctions in 2018.

===== Simultaneous ascending multiple-round auction =====
In a simultaneous ascending multiple-round (SMR) auction, all licenses are available for bidding at the same time throughout the entire auction, thus the term "simultaneous". Unlike most auctions in which bidding is continuous, SMR auctions have discrete, successive rounds, with the length of each round announced in advance by the commission.

Participants may bid on multiple licenses at once. After each round closes, round results are processed and made public. Only then do bidders learn about the bids placed by other bidders. This provides information about the value of the licenses to all bidders and increases the likelihood that the licenses will be assigned to the bidders who value them the most. The period between auction rounds also allows bidders to take stock of, and perhaps adjust, their bidding strategies.

In an SMR auction, there is no preset number of rounds. All licenses will continue to be for sale until there are none left or there are no buyers. In other words, bidding continues round after round, until a round occurs in which all bidder activity ceases. That round becomes the closing round of the auction.

===== Anonymous bidding =====
Information about anonymous bidding can be found under the section “Information Procedures During the Auction Process” within the FCC's Public Notice for any particular auction. For example, the established procedures for the FCC's 2018 5G Spectrum Auction 101 state that information to be made public after each round of bidding will include, for each license, the number of bidders that placed a bid on the license, the amount of every bid placed, whether a bid was withdrawn, the minimum acceptable bid amount for the next round, and whether the license has a provisionally winning bid.

The amount of information available about the participants in the auctions is limited until the auction is officially over. This means that the amount of money a company has bid (or withdrawn) on a license will not be available to the public until the auction is closed. The names of the companies participating and what licenses they were going for when they filled out their applications is also protected. This rule also states that bidders are not allowed to cooperate with one another, or share bidding strategies, or have discussions on bids and what they would do with them in the market.

===== Bidding rounds =====
For each auction, the initial schedule for bidding rounds is typically released by the FCC in the Public Notice listing the qualified bidders before bidding in the auction starts. A Simultaneous Multiple-Round Auction offers every license for bid at the same time and consists of successive bidding rounds in which qualified bidders may place bids on individual licenses. Unless otherwise announced, bids will be accepted on all licenses in each round of the auction until bidding stops on every license. Each round of sequential bidding rounds is followed by the release of that round's results. Multiple bidding rounds may be conducted each day.

Round results are released within approximately 15 minutes after each round closes. They are available for downloading, both to bidders and to the general public. Interested parties may perform detailed analysis by loading these data files into a spreadsheet program or the Auction Tracking Tool, which is provided by the FCC for most auctions.

===== Stopping rule =====
This rule was enacted to end the bidding at a reasonable time. When the FCC employs a simultaneous stopping rule approach to an auction, as it has in Auction 101 of its 2018 5G Spectrum Auctions, this means all licenses remain available for bidding until bidding stops on every license. Specifically, bidding will close on all licenses after the first round in which no bidder submits any new bids, applies a proactive waiver, or withdraws any provisionally winning bids. Bidding will remain open on all licenses until bidding stops on every license. Also, in the first round, if participants don't make a bid, the auction will be closed.

===== Auction delay, suspension and cancellation =====
The FCC's Public Notice for any particular auction includes a section titled “Auction Delay, Suspension, or Cancellation” that outlines the cases in which an auction may be delayed, suspended, or cancelled. For example, the established procedures for the FCC's 2018 5G Spectrum Auction 101 state that at any time before or during the bidding process, the Bureau may delay, suspend, or cancel bidding in the auction in the event of a natural disaster, technical obstacle, network interruption, administrative or weather necessity, evidence of an auction security breach or unlawful bidding activity, or for any other reason that affects the fair and efficient conduct of competitive bidding. The Bureau will notify participants of any such delay, suspension, or cancellation by public notice and/or through the FCC auction bidding system's announcement function. If the bidding is delayed or suspended, the Bureau may, in its sole discretion, elect to resume the auction starting from the beginning of the current round or from some previous round, or cancel the auction in its entirety.

===== Voluntary surrender of licenses =====
In order to prevent network congestion, FCC chairman Julius Genachowski sought companies who would voluntarily surrender their unused spectrum in exchange for a share of the money made from the spectrum auction. With the growing demands for wireless services, the Obama Administration approved a plan, called the National Broadband Plan of making 500 MHz of spectrum, below 3 GHz, available over the next 10 years. The majority of the spectrum being examined by the FCC and NTIA are federally owned or federally shared bands. Regulators and carriers have also been considering blocks of the 300 MHz spectrum which is normally used for television broadcasters. If a company agrees to volunteer their spectrum, the FCC will ask for 120 MHz of it. Also, the FCC has been thinking about spectrum sharing which would allow wireless ISPs to purchase DTV licenses

In January 2011, Clearwire agreed to sell off its unused spectrum in order to raise money for company spectrum and to seemingly allow other companies to pick up on some unused space.

== See also ==
- Digital dividend after digital television transition
- Policies promoting wireless broadband
- White space (radio)
- White space (database)
