= Digital dividend after digital television transition =

The digital dividend refers to the radio spectrum which is released in the process of digital television transition. When television broadcasters switch from analog TV to digital-only platforms, part of the electromagnetic spectrum that has been used for broadcasting will be freed-up because digital television needs less spectrum than analog television, due to lossy compression. One reason is that new digital video compression technology can transmit numerous digital subchannels using the same amount of spectrum used to transmit one analog TV channel. However, the primary reason is that digital transmissions require much less of a guard band on either side, since they are not nearly as prone to RF interference from adjacent channels. Because of this, there is no longer any need to leave empty channels to protect stations from each other, in turn allowing stations to be repacked into fewer channels, leaving more contiguous spectrum to be allocated for other Wireless services.

The digital dividend usually locates at frequency bands from 174 to 230 MHz (VHF) and from 470 to 862 MHz (UHF), with its midpoint being chosen precisely as 666 MHz. However, the location and size of digital dividend vary among countries due to the factors including geographical position and penetration of satellite/cable services.

As a result of the technological transition, a significant number of governments are now planning for or allocating their digital dividends. For examples, the United States completed its transition on 12 June 2009 and auctioned the spectrum. Meanwhile, Australia is still planning for it.

== Potential uses ==
In countries where the digital television transition has not yet finished, over-the-air broadcasting services are still using radio-frequency spectrum in what is known as the Very High Frequency (VHF) and Ultra High Frequency (UHF) bands. After the completion of digital transition, part of this spectrum will be released as digital dividend to provide a range of new communication services. Proposed utilization of the released spectrum includes:

- Digital Terrestrial TV
- Advanced Mobile Services
- Broadcast Mobile TV
- Commercial Wireless Broadband services, both to fixed locations and mobile devices
- Wireless Broadband services for public safety and disaster relief (PPDR)
- Services ancillary to broadcasting and programming (SAB/SAP)

Analog television spectrum in the UHF bands is valuable to potential purchasers because of its ability to carry signals over long distances, penetrate buildings and carry large amounts of data.

Many countries favour using a part of the digital dividend for electronic communications services, such as mobile communications and wireless broadband. These new services would utilize the upper part of the UHF band (790–862 MHz).

=== Allocation for mobile services ===
One proposal to utilize the digital dividend is to develop an international mobile service using frequencies which will be released after the completion of digital transition in a global range. This part spectrum suits for 3G mobile telecommunication service. However, it would be difficult to fully realize the potentials of the digital dividend because countries in the world will not finish the switch to digital TV simultaneously. Further it is an issue involving factors such as topography, penetration of satellite/cable services, the requirements for regional service, spectrum usage in neighboring countries, etc.

In 2007, the World Radiocommunication Conference revised the allocation of a portion of UHF spectrum for mobile broadband services and advanced mobile services. Although the allocations set a framework, they do not dictate member countries how to allocate digital dividend spectrum. Rather they can take national requirements into consideration. Countries in global regions one and three, such as Europe, the Middle East, Africa, Russia, Asia and Australia use the spectrum range 790–960 MHz, which is one of the bands dedicated to the roll-out of international mobile telecommunications (IMT). Some countries in global region three, such as Bangladesh, China, Korea, India, Japan, New Zealand, Papua New Guinea, Philippines, and Singapore, identified the band or portions of the band 698–790 MHz for the implementation of IMT. Meanwhile, the spectrum 698–960 MHz was planned for implementation of IMT in global region two, the Americas. However, part of the spectrum, 806–960 MHz, is already used for mobile telecommunications in global region two.

=== Benefits of mobile broadband use ===
Experts see several benefits of using the freed spectrum for mobile broadband because it is cheaper than fixed broadband to provide last mile connectivity.

It could facilitate economic development. McKinsey's report suggested that every 10% increase in household broadband penetration will bring 1.4% increase of GDP growth. Usually GDP growth leads to job creations. One good thing about mobile broadband is that mobile penetration is much higher than PC penetration, that means mobile broadband will help to the broadband penetration to increase faster.

Mobile broadband could be used to serve people living in rural area and low income groups, such as farmers. It could provide them medical, educational and other general information.

=== For bridging the digital divide ===
Some researchers argued that digital dividend could provide opportunity to bridging the digital divide. They argued that because of the characteristics of this spectrum fewer radio stations are needed to cover a given area. Therefore, the cost to provide broadband in remote rural areas could be significantly reduced. In the past, a profitable roll out of fixed line broadband infrastructure is not feasible because the necessary investments to cover the long distances are too high. However, wireless broadband using the spectrum of the digital dividend offers an opportunity to overcome the digital divide.

But not all of them agree with the point. Those who do not agree, argued that this approach suffers from the trade-off between reach and speed significantly limit scalability of the network. If the transmission demands grow at current rates, a wireless broadband access network covering large areas will be likely outdated before being deployed. Therefore, the digital divide will still exist.

== Digital dividend policies around the world ==
=== United States ===
==== 700 MHz Auction ====
The chunk of spectrum being freed from broadcasting was auctioned for commercial uses in the U.S. The 700 MHz auction, known officially as Auction 73, concluded with 1090 provisionally winning bids covering 1091 licenses and raised a total of $19,120,378,000 in winning bids and $18,957,582,150 in net winning bids.

Due to its physical attributes, 700 MHz band penetrates walls fairly easily and well. This makes this chunk of spectrum perfect for either cellular or long-range wireless broadband. A telco could build a powerful wireless network by holding it. An ISP could also make money with it.

The auction went the following way: part of the available spectrum, which spans 698–806 MHz, had already been auctioned off, some of it is reserved for the nationwide public safety broadband network that will be constructed over the next few years. The remaining was divided up into A, B, C, D, and E blocks, regionally. Every bidder was supposed to secretly declare their intent to the FCC before the auction, but Google did not comply and kept its intentions secret. Winners picked up their allocations around two months after the auction.

There was a lot of excitement over the auction of C and D blocks. Block C was the prime spectrum that Verizon and others, such as Google, were interested in. This block covered two 11 MHz chunks of spectrum that could be bid on together, making 22 MHz available. Besides the bidders of this chunk, the other reason drawing attention to this block was that Google convinced the FCC to load up with two open-access provisions: (i) the winner has to make the network open so any "safe" device can use it; (ii) they have to make their own networked devices open as well.

The block D licenses covers two 5 MHz sections for a total of 10 MHz. This block is special compared with other blocks because the winners must be part of the Public Safety/Private Partnership established by the FCC. Therefore, the winner's wireless network has to be good enough to meet public safety specifications for coverage and redundancy. Furthermore, the winner could operate two public safety portions, 10 MHz, as a commercial network. Commercial traffic can also be carried over the public safety portion of the network as long as it is not being utilized.

The blocks A, B, and E covered 30 MHz in total. The licenses for each of the blocks were only good for small geographic areas. The FCC's intention was that the winners would use the spectrum for regional or rural area telecommunication services.

There were some other conditions for the winners of blocks A, B, C, and E. For blocks A, B and E, winners needed to cover at least 35 percent of the territory of their license within four years, and a full 70 percent of the territory within 10 years. For block C the winners were also required to cover 40 percent of the territory within four years, 75 percent coverage within 10 years. The FCC will automatically reclaim "unserved portions of the license area" from companies that do not meet the build-out requirements.

Not all of the licenses were sold. On April 15, 2011, the FCC announced that they would hold auction 92 on July 19, 2011, to sell the available license of 700 MHz. The results for all of the blocks were as follows:

===== Block A =====
Verizon Wireless and U.S. Cellular Corp. got 25 licenses each. But no one company dominated the A-Block. Other notable winners included CenturyTel Inc. and Cellular South. Verizon Wireless's licenses mainly covered densely populated urban areas, while U.S. Cellular was focused on the ones for the Midwest, Northeast and Northwest.

===== Block B =====
AT&T Mobility got one-third of the available licenses, spending $6.6 billion. U.S. Cellular snapped 127 licenses which are near its current market clusters in the Midwest, Northeast and Northwest. Verizon Wireless scooped up 77 B-Block licenses.

===== Block C =====
Verizon Wireless paid more than $4.6 billion for licenses covering the contiguous 48 states as well as Hawaii. Triad 700 L.L.C. picked up C-Block licenses covering Alaska, Puerto Rico and the U.S. Virgin Islands, while Small Ventures USA L.P. bought the license for the C Block covering the Gulf of Mexico. Also in Tanzania

===== Block D =====
No licenses were sold in this block and new auctions were scheduled to sell it.

===== Block E =====
EchoStar Corp, satellite television provider, picked up 168 of the total 176 E-Block licenses for more than $711 million. Qualcomm also bought 5 licenses covering markets in California, Arizona and the Northeast.

===== The winners =====
Of the 214 applicants approved to bid in the FCC's auction, 101 walked away with spectrum.

Verizon Wireless's winnings covered seven of the 10 regional C-Block licenses, as well as 77 licenses in the B Block and 25 licenses in the A Block.

AT&T Mobility spent $6.64 billion for 227 B-Block licenses.

The remaining C-block licenses were won by a number of operators:

- Triad 700 L.L.C. took the Alaska and Puerto Rico/U.S. Virgin Islands licenses and Small Ventures USA L.P. took the Gulf of Mexico license.
- Qualcomm Inc. won nine licenses for a total of around $500 million: B-Block licenses covering Yuba City and Imperial, Calif., and Hunterdon, N.J.; and five E Block licenses.
- MetroPCS Communications Inc. scored only one license, the A Block for Boston, for $313 million.
- Chevron walked away with the A, B and E blocks covering the Gulf of Mexico, most likely for the company's oil operations there.
- Cavalier Wireless spent $61.8 million for licenses across the A and B Blocks.
- Cox Communications won $304 million in the A and B blocks.
- U.S. Cellular won 152 licenses for $401 million in the A and B Block.
- Regional telecom operator CenturyTel Inc. spent close to $150 million for 48 B-Block licenses and 21 A-Block licenses.
- Vulcan Ventures, owned by Microsoft co-founder Paul Allen, won two licenses, in the Seattle/Tacoma and Portland/Salem markets, for $112 million.
- Regional wireless provider Cellular South spent $191.5 million on A- and B-Block licenses.

=== Europe ===
The European Union has not yet worked out a specific plan on how to use the freed spectrum. According to the visions of trans-European 4G mobile wireless, economists predict that it will bring €50 billion economic growth. To utilize the full benefit of the digital dividend, the European countries at least have two steps to take: first, all member states of the European Union are requested to make sure that the switchover to digital transmission technologies will be completed by 1 January 2012. Therefore, the complete digital dividend should be made available for communication services. Second, member states shall use a standardized regulatory framework to ensure the use for the 790–862 MHz sub-band for electronic communications services throughout the EU (European Commission 2009).

The EU published a schedule table in the 2009 Report for the European Commission 'Exploiting the digital dividend' – a European approach.

Table: Spectrum auction plans for the digital dividend and left-over 2G and 3G spectrum in 2009

Country	Date
Belgium	Fourth 3G license – 2010 2.6 GHz – 2010
France	Fourth 3G license – Q4 2009 800 MHz and 2.6 GHz – 2010; 700 MHz - Q4 2015
Germany	800 MHz, 1.8 GHz, 2.1 GHz, 2.6 GHz – mid-2010 but might be delayed by legal challenges
Italy	2.6 GHz – 2010/11
Netherlands	2.6 GHz – Q1 2010 800 MHz, 900 MHz, 1.8 GHz, 1.9 GHz, 2.6 GHz – Q4 2012
Spain	800 MHz, 900 MHz, 1.8 GHz, 2.6 GHz – 2011
United Kingdom	800 MHz and 2.6 GHz – late-2012

As of 2015, the digital television transition has been completed in all of the member states of the European Union.

=== Canada ===
In Canada, the digital dividend auction was held in 2014 to allocate 108 MHz of spectrum from 698 to 804 MHz. This followed a consultation by Industry Canada on whether to abolish or at least scale back restrictions on foreign investment considered among the most restrictive in the G8 group of countries.

=== Australia ===
In Australia an independent engineering consultancy firm, Kordia Pty Ltd, was commissioned by the Department of Broadband, Communications and the Digital Economy to identify issues and options for releasing spectrum after analog television is switched off. Kordia found that it is possible for 126 MHz of UHF spectrum to be released as a digital dividend.

The government also have some other factors to consider:

1. The uncertainty of future uses of spectrum;
2. Australia needs to align spectrum allocations with other major developed countries;
3. Public interest.

Based on the political and technological considerations Australia government's target digital dividend is 126 MHz of contiguous UHF spectrum.

== See also ==
- Spectrum auction
- White spaces (radio)
- White spaces (database)
