= Metric Systems Corporation =

American technology company

- Industry: Wireless Networking
- Founded: 1992
- Headquarters: Vista, California, U.S.
- Key people: William "Bill" Brown, Founder, CEO
- Website: http://www.metricsystems.com/

Metric Systems Corporation (MSC) is an American company that develops, manufactures and sells wireless networking equipment and systems. Based in Carlsbad, California, MSC focuses on White spaces (radio) and other equipment and systems for the commercial, industrial, and government market place.

== History ==
In the late 2000s Metric Systems Corporation was tasked by Microsoft to provide White Space test equipment for use by the Federal Communications Commission in its decision to allow unlicensed use of White Space. Following the FCC's release of final rules for the use of TV-band devices in late 2010, Metric Systems began developing its line of VHF/UHF White Space Broadband Radios.

== Patents and technology ==
Metric Systems Corporation holds several patents in the United States and Canada which focus on Dynamic Spectrum Management and wide area wireless networking. Key patents include methods and apparatuses for adaptively setting frequency channels in a multi-point wireless networking system and maintain connectivity in the presence of noise and interference.

== Product use and field trials ==
MSC's White Space products have been evaluated by a number of domestic and international agencies and companies. In February 2013 MSC's first generation White Space VHF/UHF Broadband Radios were delivered to Brazil's CPqD for evaluation.

In July 2013, Metric Systems Corporation's White Space equipment was used by the Port of Pittsburgh for testing inland waterways.

The first carrier-class TV Band White Space Radio, the RaptorX, was certified by the FCC for unlicensed use in 2015.

In Summer 2016, MSC's production White Space Infrastructure Radio, the RaptorXR, began field trials in the mid-western United States for educational, financial, and public safety applications.
