= TV-band device =

Radio frequency device

TV band devices or TVBDs are unlicensed radio frequency devices operating in the vacant channels or white spaces between US television channels in the range of 54 to 698 MHz. The rules defining these devices were announced on November 4, 2008, and published by the U.S. Federal Communications Commission (FCC) on November 14, 2008. The rules were finalized on September 23, 2010. Much of the work behind the definition of these devices was done by the White Spaces Coalition.

== Types of TVBDs ==
- A Mode I TVBD is portable device that does not have an internal geolocation capability and access to a database of channels in use. Mode I devices must get a list of available channels from a Mode II or Fixed device
- A Mode II TVBD is a portable device that does have internal geo-location capabilities and can access a database of channels in use.
- A Fixed device is a TVBD at a fixed location whose geo-graphic coordinates have been determined by an internal geo-location capability or by a professional installer.
- A Sensing-only device is a TVBD that determines which channels are available by monitoring for activity. They must listen for 30 seconds to determine the channel is not in use and check again for activity once every minute. They must limit their power to 50 mW and only operate on channels 21 and above. A sensing-only device must vacate a channel within two seconds of detecting non-TVBD activity.

Fixed devices may use any of the vacant US TV channels 2, 5-36 and 38-51 with a power of up to 1 watt (4 watts EIRP). They may communicate with each other on any of these channels, and also with personal/portable devices in the TV channels 21 through 51. Fixed devices must be location-aware, query an FCC-mandated database at least daily to retrieve a list of usable channels at their location, and must also monitor the spectrum locally. They may transmit only within the TV channels where both the database indicates operation is permissible, and no signals are detected locally. Personal/portable stations may operate only on channels 21-36 and 38-51, with a power of 100 mW EIRP, or 40 mW if on a channel adjacent to a nearby television channel. They may either retrieve a list of permissible channels from an associated fixed station, or may accept a lower output power of 50 mW EIRP and use only spectrum sensing.<r

=== Power Spectral Density (PSD) Limits ===
The maximum power transmitted in any 100 kHz segment of spectrum is subject to the following limitations

- Fixed devices: 12.2 dBm
- Personal/portable devices: 2.2 dBm
- Sensing-only device -0.8 dBm
- Personal/portable devices operating adjacent to a nearby television channel: -1.8 dBm

=== Transmit Power Control ===
All TVBDs must incorporate a feature to reduce transmitted power to the minimum level necessary to maintain successful communication.

=== Antenna Height Restriction ===
The transmit antenna used with fixed devices may not be more than 30 meters above the ground. Fixed devices may not be located at sites where the height above average terrain (HAAT) is greater than 76 meters.
