= Cognitive radio =

Dynamically programmable radio

A cognitive radio (CR) is a radio that can be programmed and configured dynamically to use the best channels in its vicinity to avoid user interference and congestion. Such a radio automatically detects available channels, then accordingly changes its transmission or reception parameters to allow a greater number of concurrent wireless communications in a given band at one location. This process is a form of dynamic spectrum management.

== Description ==
In response to the operator's commands, the cognitive engine is capable of configuring radio-system parameters. These parameters include "waveform, protocol, operating frequency, and networking". This functions as an autonomous unit in the communications environment, exchanging information about the environment with the networks it accesses and other cognitive radios (CRs). A CR "monitors its own performance continuously", in addition to "reading the radio's outputs"; it then uses this information to "determine the RF environment, channel conditions, link performance, etc.", and adjusts the "radio's settings to deliver the required quality of service subject to an appropriate combination of user requirements, operational limitations, and regulatory constraints".

Some "smart radio" proposals combine wireless mesh network—dynamically changing the path messages take between two given nodes using cooperative diversity; cognitive radio—dynamically changing the frequency band used by messages between two consecutive nodes on the path; and software-defined radio—dynamically changing the protocol used by message between two consecutive nodes.

== History ==
The concept of cognitive radio was first proposed by Joseph Mitola III in a seminar at KTH Royal Institute of Technology in Stockholm in 1998 and published in an article by Mitola and Gerald Q. Maguire, Jr. in 1999. It was a novel approach in wireless communications, which Mitola later described as:

The point in which wireless personal digital assistants (PDAs) and the related networks are sufficiently computationally intelligent about radio resources and related computer-to-computer communications to detect user communications needs as a function of use context, and to provide radio resources and wireless services most appropriate to those needs.

Cognitive radio is considered as a goal towards which a software-defined radio platform should evolve: a fully reconfigurable wireless transceiver which automatically adapts its communication parameters to network and user demands.

Traditional regulatory structures have been built for an analog model and are not optimized for cognitive radio. Regulatory bodies in the world (including the Federal Communications Commission in the United States and Ofcom in the United Kingdom) as well as different independent measurement campaigns found that most radio frequency spectrum was inefficiently utilized. Cellular network bands are overloaded in most parts of the world, but other frequency bands (such as military, amateur radio and paging frequencies) are insufficiently utilized. Independent studies performed in some countries confirmed that observation, and concluded that spectrum utilization depends on time and place. Moreover, fixed spectrum allocation prevents rarely used frequencies (those assigned to specific services) from being used, even when any unlicensed users would not cause noticeable interference to the assigned service. Regulatory bodies in the world have been considering whether to allow unlicensed users in licensed bands if they would not cause any interference to licensed users. These initiatives have focused cognitive-radio research on dynamic spectrum access.

The first cognitive radio wireless regional area network standard, IEEE 802.22, was developed by IEEE 802 LAN/MAN Standard Committee (LMSC) and published in 2011. This standard uses geolocation and spectrum sensing for spectral awareness. Geolocation combines with a database of licensed transmitters in the area to identify available channels for use by the cognitive radio network. Spectrum sensing observes the spectrum and identifies occupied channels. IEEE 802.22 was designed to utilize the unused frequencies or fragments of time in a location. This white space is unused television channels in the geolocated areas. However, cognitive radio cannot occupy the same unused space all the time. As spectrum availability changes, the network adapts to prevent interference with licensed transmissions.

== Terminology ==
Depending on transmission and reception parameters, there are two main types of cognitive radio:

- Full Cognitive Radio (Mitola radio), in which every possible parameter observable by a wireless node (or network) is considered.
- Spectrum-Sensing Cognitive Radio, in which only the radio-frequency spectrum is considered.

Other types are dependent on parts of the spectrum available for cognitive radio:

- Licensed-Band Cognitive Radio, capable of using bands assigned to licensed users (except for unlicensed bands, such as the U-NII band or the ISM band). The IEEE 802.22 working group is developing a standard for wireless regional area network (WRAN), which will operate on unused television channels, also known as TV white spaces.
- Unlicensed-Band Cognitive Radio, which can only utilize unlicensed parts of the radio frequency (RF) spectrum. One such system is described in the IEEE 802.15 Task Group 2 specifications, which focus on the coexistence of IEEE 802.11 and Bluetooth.
- Spectrum mobility: Process by which a cognitive-radio user changes its frequency of operation. Cognitive-radio networks aim to use the spectrum in a dynamic manner by allowing radio terminals to operate in the best available frequency band, maintaining seamless communication requirements during transitions to better spectrum.
- Spectrum sharing: Spectrum sharing cognitive radio networks allow cognitive radio users to share the spectrum bands of the licensed-band users. However, the cognitive radio users have to restrict their transmit power so that the interference caused to the licensed-band users is kept below a certain threshold.
- Sensing-based Spectrum sharing: In sensing-based spectrum sharing cognitive radio networks, cognitive radio users first listen to the spectrum allocated to the licensed users to detect the state of the licensed users. Based on the detection results, cognitive radio users decide their transmission strategies. If the licensed users are not using the bands, cognitive radio users will transmit over those bands. If the licensed users are using the bands, cognitive radio users share the spectrum bands with the licensed users by restricting their transmit power.
- Database-enabled Spectrum Sharing,,: In this modality of spectrum sharing, cognitive radio users are required to access a white space database prior to be allowed, or denied, access to the shared spectrum. The white space database contain algorithms, mathematical models and local regulations to predict the spectrum utilization in a geographical area and to infer on the risk of interference posed to incumbent services by a cognitive radio user accessing the shared spectrum. If the white space database judges that destructive interference to incumbents will happen, the cognitive radio user is denied access to the shared spectrum.

== Technology ==
Although cognitive radio was initially thought of as a software-defined radio extension (full cognitive radio), most research work focuses on spectrum-sensing cognitive radio (particularly in the TV bands). The chief problem in spectrum-sensing cognitive radio is designing high-quality spectrum-sensing devices and algorithms for exchanging spectrum-sensing data between nodes. It has been shown that a simple energy detector cannot guarantee the accurate detection of signal presence, calling for more sophisticated spectrum sensing techniques and requiring information about spectrum sensing to be regularly exchanged between nodes. Increasing the number of cooperating sensing nodes decreases the probability of false detection.

Filling free RF bands adaptively, using OFDMA, is a possible approach. Timo A. Weiss and Friedrich K. Jondral of the University of Karlsruhe proposed a spectrum pooling system, in which free bands (sensed by nodes) were immediately filled by OFDMA subbands. Applications of spectrum-sensing cognitive radio include emergency-network and WLAN higher throughput and transmission-distance extensions. The evolution of cognitive radio toward cognitive networks is underway; the concept of cognitive networks is to intelligently organize a network of cognitive radios.

=== Functions ===
The main functions of cognitive radios are:

- Power Control: Power control is usually used for spectrum sharing CR systems to maximize the capacity of secondary users with interference power constraints to protect the primary users.
- Spectrum sensing: Detecting unused spectrum and sharing it, without harmful interference to other users; an important requirement of the cognitive-radio network is to sense empty spectrum. Detecting primary users is the most efficient way to detect empty spectrum. Spectrum-sensing techniques may be grouped into three categories:
  - Transmitter detection: Cognitive radios must have the capability to determine if a signal from a primary transmitter is locally present in a certain spectrum. There are several proposed approaches to transmitter detection:
    - Matched filter detection
    - Energy detection: Energy detection is a spectrum sensing method that detects the presence/absence of a signal just by measuring the received signal power. This signal detection approach is quite easy and convenient for practical implementation. To implement energy detector, however, noise variance information is required. It has been shown that an imperfect knowledge of the noise power (noise uncertainty) may lead to the phenomenon of the SNR wall, which is a SNR level below which the energy detector can not reliably detect any transmitted signal even increasing the observation time. It has also been shown that the SNR wall is not caused by the presence of a noise uncertainty itself, but by an insufficient refinement of the noise power estimation while the observation time increases.
    - Cyclostationary-feature detection: These types of spectrum sensing algorithms are motivated because most man-made communication signals, such as BPSK, QPSK, AM, OFDM, etc. exhibit cyclostationary behavior. However, noise signals (typically white noise) do not exhibit cyclostationary behavior. These detectors are robust against noise variance uncertainty. The aim of such detectors is to exploit the cyclostationary nature of man-made communication signals buried in noise. Their main decision parameter is comparing the non zero values obtained by CSD of the primary signal. Cyclostationary detectors can be either single cycle or multicycle cyclostationary.
- Wideband spectrum sensing: refers to spectrum sensing over large spectral bandwidth, typically hundreds of MHz or even several GHz. Since current ADC technology cannot afford the high sampling rate with high resolution, it requires revolutional techniques, e.g., compressive sensing and sub-Nyquist sampling.
  - Cooperative detection: Refers to spectrum-sensing methods where information from multiple cognitive-radio users is incorporated for primary-user detection
  - Interference-based detection
- Null-space based CR: With the aid of multiple antennas, CR detects the null-space of the primary-user and then transmits within the null-space, such that its subsequent transmission causes less interference to the primary-user
- Spectrum management: Capturing the best available spectrum to meet user communication requirements, while not creating undue interference to other (primary) users. Cognitive radios should decide on the best spectrum band (of all bands available) to meet quality of service requirements; therefore, spectrum-management functions are required for cognitive radios. Spectrum-management functions are classified as:
  - Spectrum analysis
  - Spectrum decision

The practical implementation of spectrum-management functions is a complex and multifaceted issue, since it must address a variety of technical and legal requirements. An example of the former is choosing an appropriate sensing threshold to detect other users, while the latter is exemplified by the need to meet the rules and regulations set out for radio spectrum access in international (ITU radio regulations) and national (telecommunications law) legislation. Artificial Intelligence based algorithms algorithm for dynamic spectrum allocation and interference management in order to reduce harmful interference to other services and networks will be a key technology enabler towards 6G. This will pave the way for more flexibility in the management and regulation of the radioelectric spectrum.

=== Intelligent antenna (IA) ===
An intelligent antenna (or smart antenna) is an antenna technology that uses spatial beam-formation and spatial coding to cancel interference; however, applications are emerging for extension to intelligent multiple or cooperative-antenna arrays for application to complex communication environments. Cognitive radio, by comparison, allows user terminals to sense whether a portion of the spectrum is being used in order to share spectrum with neighbor users. The following table compares the two:

Point	Cognitive radio (CR)	Intelligent antenna (IA)
Principal goal	Open spectrum sharing	Ambient spatial reuse
Interference processing	Avoidance by spectrum sensing	Cancellation by spatial precoding/post-coding
Key cost	Spectrum sensing and multi-band RF	Multiple- or cooperative-antenna arrays
Challenging algorithm	Spectrum management tech	Intelligent spatial beamforming/coding tech
Applied techniques	Cognitive software radio	Generalized dirty paper coding and Wyner-Ziv coding
Basement approach	Orthogonal modulation	Cellular based smaller cell
Competitive technology	Ultra-wideband for greater band utilization	Multi-sectoring (3, 6, 9, so on) for higher spatial reuse
Summary	Cognitive spectrum-sharing technology	Intelligent spectrum reuse technology

Note that both techniques can be combined as illustrated in many contemporary transmission scenarios.

Cooperative MIMO (CO-MIMO) combines both techniques.

== Applications ==
Cognitive Radio (CR) can sense its environment and, without the intervention of the user, can adapt to the user's communications needs while conforming to FCC rules in the United States. In theory, the amount of spectrum is infinite; practically, for propagation and other reasons it is finite because of the desirability of certain spectrum portions. Assigned spectrum is far from being fully utilized, and efficient spectrum use is a growing concern; CR offers a solution to this problem. A CR can intelligently detect whether any portion of the spectrum is in use, and can temporarily use it without interfering with the transmissions of other users. According to Bruce Fette, "Some of the radio's other cognitive abilities include determining its location, sensing spectrum use by neighboring devices, changing frequency, adjusting output power or even altering transmission parameters and characteristics. All of these capabilities, and others yet to be realized, will provide wireless spectrum users with the ability to adapt to real-time spectrum conditions, offering regulators, licenses and the general public flexible, efficient and comprehensive use of the spectrum".

Examples of applications include:

- The application of CR networks to emergency and public safety communications by utilizing white space
- The potential of CR networks for executing dynamic spectrum access (DSA)
- Application of CR networks to military action such as chemical biological radiological and nuclear attack detection and investigation, command control, obtaining information of battle damage evaluations, battlefield surveillance, intelligence assistance, and targeting.
- They are also proven to be helpful in establishing Medical Body Area Networks which can be utilized in omnipresent patient monitoring that aids in immediately notifying the doctors regarding vital information of patients such as sugar level, blood pressure, blood oxygen and electrocardiogram (ECG), etc. This gives the additional advantage of reducing the risk of infections and also increases the patient's mobility.
- Cognitive radio is practical also to wireless sensor networks, where packet relaying can take place using primary and secondary queues to forward packets without delays and with minimum power consumption.

== Simulation of CR networks ==
At present, modeling & simulation is the only paradigm which allows the simulation of complex behavior in a given environment's cognitive radio networks. Network simulators like OPNET, NetSim, MATLAB and ns2 can be used to simulate a cognitive radio network. CogNS is an open-source NS2-based simulation framework for cognitive radio networks. Areas of research using network simulators include:

1. Spectrum sensing & incumbent detection
2. Spectrum allocation
3. Measurement and/or modeling of spectrum usage
4. Efficiency of spectrum utilization

Network Simulator 3 (ns-3) is also a viable option for simulating CR. ns-3 can be also used to emulate and experiment CR networks with the aid from commodity hardware like Atheros WiFi devices.

== Future plans ==
The success of the unlicensed band in accommodating a range of wireless devices and services has led the FCC to consider opening further bands for unlicensed use. In contrast, the licensed bands are underutilized due to static frequency allocation. Realizing that CR technology has the potential to exploit the inefficiently utilized licensed bands without causing interference to incumbent users, the FCC released a Notice of Proposed Rule Making which would allow unlicensed radios to operate in the TV-broadcast bands. The IEEE 802.22 working group, formed in November 2004, is tasked with defining the air-interface standard for wireless regional area networks (based on CR sensing) for the operation of unlicensed devices in the spectrum allocated to TV service. To comply with later FCC regulations on unlicensed utilization of TV spectrum, the IEEE 802.22 has defined interfaces to the mandatory TV White Space Database in order to avoid interference to incumbent services. Although spectrum geolocation databases allow reducing the receiver complexity, and interference probability, for instance from sensing errors or hidden nodes, this comes at the cost of a lower spectrum utilization efficiency as the databases can not capture a fine-grained quantification of spectrum utilization and are not updated in real-time. Collaborative sensing, and distributed spectrum management based on artificial intelligence could contribute in the future towards a better balance between spectrum utilization efficiency and interference mitigation.

== See also ==
- Channel allocation schemes
- Channel-dependent scheduling
- Cognitive network
- Cooperative diversity
- Dirty paper coding
- Link adaptation
- LTE Advanced
- Network Simulator
- OFDMA
- Radio resource management (RRM)
- White spaces (radio)
- White spaces (database)
- Software-defined radio
