= Spectrum pooling =

Spectrum pooling is a spectrum management strategy in which multiple radio spectrum users can coexist within a single allocation of radio spectrum space. One use of this technique is for primary users of a spectrum allocation to be able to rent out use of unused parts of their allocation to secondary users. Spectrum pooling schemes generally require cognitive radio techniques to implement them.
