= IEEE 802.22 =

IEEE data communication standard

IEEE 802.22, is a standard for wireless regional area network (WRAN) using white spaces in the television (TV) frequency spectrum. The development of the IEEE 802.22 WRAN standard is aimed at using cognitive radio (CR) techniques to allow sharing of geographically unused spectrum allocated to the television broadcast service, on a non-interfering basis, to bring broadband access to hard-to-reach, low population density areas, typical of rural environments, and is therefore timely and has the potential for a wide applicability worldwide. It is the first worldwide effort to define a standardized air interface based on CR techniques for the opportunistic use of TV bands on a non-interfering basis.

IEEE 802.22 WRANs are designed to operate in the TV broadcast bands while assuring that no harmful interference is caused to the incumbent operation: digital TV and analog TV broadcasting, and low power licensed devices such as wireless microphones. The standard was expected to be finalized in Q1 2010, but was finally published in July 2011.

IEEE P802.22.1 is a related standard being developed to enhance harmful interference protection for low power licensed devices operating in TV Broadcast Bands.. IEEE P802.22.2 is a recommended practice for the installation and deployment of IEEE 802.22 Systems. IEEE 802.22 WG is a working group of IEEE 802 LAN/MAN standards committee which was chartered to write the 802.22 standard. The two 802.22 task groups (TG1 and TG2) are writing 802.22.1 and 802.22.2 respectively.

== Technology ==
In response to a notice of proposed rulemaking (NPRM) issued by the U.S. Federal Communications Commission (FCC) in May 2004, the IEEE 802.22 working group on Wireless Regional Area Networks was formed in October 2004. Its project, formally called as Standard for Wireless Regional Area Networks (WRAN) - Specific requirements - Part 22: Cognitive Wireless RAN Medium Access Control (MAC) and Physical Layer (PHY) Specifications: Policies and procedures for operation in the TV Bands focused on constructing a consistent, national fixed point-to-multipoint WRAN that will use UHF/VHF TV bands between 54 and 862 MHz. Specific TV channels as well as the guard bands of these channels are planned to be used for communication in IEEE 802.22.

The Institute of Electrical and Electronics Engineers (IEEE), together with the FCC, pursued a centralized approach for available spectrum discovery. Specifically each base station (BS) would be armed with a GPS receiver which would allow its position to be reported. This information would be sent back to centralized servers (in the USA these would be managed by the FCC), which would respond with the information about available free TV channels and guard bands in the area of the BS. Other proposals would allow local spectrum sensing only, where the BS would decide by itself which channels are available for communication. A combination of these two approaches is also envisioned. Devices which would operate in the TV white space band (TVWS) would be mainly of two types: Fixed and Personal/Portable. Fixed devices would have geolocation capability with an embedded GPS device. Fixed devices also communicate with the central database to identify other transmitters in the area operating in TVWS. Other measures suggested by the FCC and IEEE to avoid interference include dynamic spectrum sensing and dynamic power control.

== Overview of the WRAN topology ==
The initial drafts of the 802.22 standard specify that the network should operate in a point to multipoint basis (P2MP). The system will be formed by base stations (BS) and customer-premises equipment (CPE). The CPEs will be attached to a BS via a wireless link. The BSs will control the medium access for all the CPEs attached to it.

One key feature of the WRAN Base Stations is that they will be capable of performing a cognitive sensing. This is that the CPEs will be sensing the spectrum and will be sending periodic reports to the BS informing it about what they sense. The BS, with the information gathered, will evaluate whether a change is necessary in the channel used, or on the contrary, if it should stay transmitting and receiving in the same one.

== An approach to the PHY layer ==
The PHY layer must be able to adapt to different conditions and also needs to be flexible for jumping from channel to channel without errors in transmission or losing clients (CPEs). This flexibility is also required for being able to dynamically adjust the bandwidth, modulation and coding schemes. OFDMA will be the modulation scheme for transmission in up and downlinks. With OFDMA it will be possible to achieve this fast adaptation needed for the BS's and CPEs. By using just one TV channel (a TV channel has a bandwidth of 6 MHz; in some countries they can be of 7 or 8 MHz) the approximate maximum bit rate is 19 Mbit/s at a 30 km distance. The speed and distance achieved is not enough to fulfill the requirements of the standard. The feature Channel Bonding deals with this problem. Channel Bonding consists in using more than one channel for Tx / Rx. This allows the system to have higher bandwidth which will be reflected in a better system performance.

== An approach to the MAC layer ==
This layer will be based on cognitive radio technology. It also needs to be able to adapt dynamically to changes in the environment by sensing the spectrum. The MAC layer will consist of two structures: Frame and Superframe. A superframe will be formed by many frames. The superframe will have a superframe control header (SCH) and a preamble. These will be sent by the BS in every channel that it's possible to transmit and not cause interference. When a CPE is turned on, it will sense the spectrum, find out which channels are available and will receive all the needed information to attach to the BS.

Two different types of spectrum measurement will be done by the CPE: in-band and out-of-band. The in-band measurement consists in sensing the actual channel that is being used by the BS and CPE. The out-of-band measurement will consist in sensing the rest of the channels. The MAC layer will perform two different types of sensing in either in-band or out-of-band measurements: fast sensing and fine sensing. Fast sensing will consist in sensing at speeds of under 1ms per channel. This sensing is performed by the CPE and the BS and the BS's will gather all the information and will decide if there is something new to be done. The fine sensing takes more time (approximately 25 ms per channel or more) and it is used based on the outcome of the previous fast sensing mechanism.

These sensing mechanisms are primarily used to identify if there is an incumbent transmitting, and if there is a need to avoid interfering with it.

To perform reliable sensing, in the basic operation mode on a single frequency band as described above (the "listen-before-talk" mode) one has to allocate quiet times, in which no data transmission is permitted. Such periodic interruption of data transmission could impair the QoS of cognitive radio systems. This issue is addressed by an alternative operation mode proposed in IEEE 802.22 called Dynamic frequency hopping (DFH) where data transmission of the WRAN systems are performed in parallel with spectrum sensing without any interruption.

== Encryption, authentication, and authorization ==
Only the AES-GCM authenticated encryption cipher algorithm is supported.

EAP-TLS or EAP-TTLS must be used for authentication and encryption key derivation. IEEE 802.22 defines an X.509v3 certificate profile which uses extensions for authenticating and authorization of devices based on information such as device manufacturer, MAC address, and FCC ID (the Manufacturer/ServiceProvider certificate, the CPE certificate, and the BS certificate, respectively).

This could allow for a type of customer lock-in where the network providers refuse network access to devices that have not been vetted by manufacturers of the network providers' choice (i.e. the device must possess a private key of an X.509 certificate with a chain of trust to a manufacturer certificate authority (CA) that the network provider will accept), not unlike the SIM lock in modern cellular networks and DOCSIS "certification testers" in cable networks.

== Comparison with 802.11af ==
In addition to 802.22, the IEEE has standardized another white space cognitive radio standard, 802.11af. While 802.22 is a wireless regional area network (WRAN) standard, for ranges up to 100 km, 802.11af is a wireless LAN standard designed for ranges up to 1 km. Coexistence between 802.22 and 802.11af standards can be implemented either in centralized or distributed manners and based on various coexistence techniques.

== See also ==
- IEEE 802.11af, a standard for wireless LANs in TV white space
- Geolocation Database
- How is spectrum sensing done
