= White spaces (radio) =

Frequencies allocated to a broadcasting service but not used locally

In telecommunications, white spaces refer to radio frequencies allocated to a broadcasting service but not used locally. National and international bodies assign frequencies for specific uses and, in most cases, license the rights to broadcast over these frequencies. This frequency allocation process creates a bandplan which for technical reasons assigns white space between used radio bands or channels to avoid interference. In this case, while the frequencies are unused, they have been specifically assigned for a purpose, such as a guard band. Most commonly however, these white spaces exist naturally between used channels, since assigning nearby transmissions to immediately adjacent channels will cause destructive interference to both.

In addition to white space assigned for technical reasons, there is also unused radio spectrum which has either never been used, or is becoming free as a result of technical changes. In particular, the switchover to digital television frees up large areas between about 50 MHz and 700 MHz. This is because digital transmissions can be packed into adjacent channels, while analog ones cannot. This means that the band can be compressed into fewer channels, while still allowing for more transmissions.

In the United States, the abandoned television frequencies are primarily in the upper UHF 700-megahertz band, covering TV channels 52 to 69 (698 to 806 MHz). U.S. television and its white spaces will continue to exist in UHF frequencies, as well as VHF frequencies for which mobile users and white-space devices require larger antennas. In the rest of the world, the abandoned television channels are VHF, and the resulting large VHF white spaces are being reallocated for the worldwide (except the U.S.) digital radio standard DAB and DAB+, and DMB.

== White-spaces devices ==
Various proposals, including IEEE 802.11af, IEEE 802.22 and those from the White Spaces Coalition, have advocated using white spaces left by the termination of analog TV to provide wireless broadband Internet access. A device intended to use these available channels is a white-spaces device (WSD). Such devices are designed to detect the presence of existing but unused areas of airwaves, such as those reserved for analog television, and utilize them for White Space Internet signals. Such technology is predicted to improve the availability of broadband Internet and Wi-Fi in rural areas.

Early ideas proposed including GNSS receivers and programming each WSD with a database of all TV stations in an area, however this would not have avoided other non-stationary or unlicensed users in the area, or any stations licensed or altered after the device was made. Additionally, these efforts may impact wireless microphones, medical telemetry, and other technologies that have historically relied on these open frequencies.

Professional wireless microphones have used white space for decades prior to so-called white space devices.

== Comparison with Wi-Fi ==
Like Wi-Fi, TV whitespace is a wireless connection, but uses different frequency bands. TV white space operates in 470 MHz to 698 MHz, whilst Wi-Fi operates in 2.4 and 5 GHz bands. Data transfer speed depends on the model of the radio, the vendor, the antenna length, and other factors. New radios can support more than 50 Mbit/s. Wi-Fi speed similarly depends on several factors, such as range, line of sight, and so on, but may be as much as 1000 Mbit/s using the IEEE 802.11ac standard. Range is a crucial difference between Wi-Fi and TV white space. On average, TV white space range is 6 miles (9.7 km), but it can be less or more depending on factors such as noise, line of sight and so on. One of the three main TV white space manufactures, Carlson wireless, advertises that their radios can go up to 24.8 miles (39.9 km). Both have low power consumption - 20 to 100 watts depending on the device, the antenna length, the vendor, and so on. Both technologies meet the government security standards such as FIPS 197 Compliance (Advanced Encryption Standards). While Wi-Fi works well in cities, TV white space works well in rural areas.

== By country ==
=== Argentina ===
Microsoft, in a partnership with the communications authority of Argentina, Ente Nacional de Comunicaciones (ENACOM), planned to deliver wireless access to schools in the province of Mendoza on or around August 2017. Microsoft will borrow the White Spaces hardware to ENACOM technicians, and national satellite operator ARSAT will act as the ISP. No further trial details has been delivered yet.

=== Canada ===
In August 2011, Industry Canada, the Canadian ministry for industry, launched a consultation on "Consultation on a Policy and Technical Framework for the Use of Non-Broadcasting Applications in the Television Broadcasting Bands Below 698 MHz" (pdf). The consultation closed on November 4, 2011. Submissions were received from a wide range of organisations from the telecoms and broadcast industries.

=== Colombia ===
In Colombia, the National Spectrum Agency (ANE) implemented a dynamic spectrum allocation platform to manage TV white space (TVWS) frequencies and support broadband initiatives in underserved areas. The system allows TVWS devices to access available channels based on a centralized geolocation database. The initiative, launched in 2020, was designed to align with national and international spectrum policies aimed at increasing rural internet access.

=== Kenya ===
A pilot project by Indigo Telecom/Microsoft and the Kenyan government is reportedly delivering bandwidth speeds of up to 16 Mbit/s to three rural communities, which lack electricity - Male, Gakawa and Laikipia, using a solar-powered network.

=== Namibia ===
As of July 3, 2014, a pilot project called Citizen Connect, a collaboration between the Microsoft 4Afrika Initiative, the MyDigitalBridge Foundation, and the MCA-N (Millennium Challenge Account Namibia), is slated to deliver broadband Internet to "twenty-seven schools and seven circuit offices of the Ministry of Education in Omusati, Oshana and Ohangwena", using "TV White Space technology".

=== Philippines ===
In 2014, Microsoft worked with the Philippine government to pilot a program for digitizing the management of remote fishermen.

=== Singapore ===
After FCC, Singapore Info-communications Media Development Authority is the second regulator in the world to have TV White Space regulated, ahead of UK and Canada. The Singapore efforts were driven mainly by the Singapore White Spaces Pilot Group (SWSPG) founded by the Institute for Infocomm Research, Microsoft and StarHub. The Institute for Infocomm Research subsequently spun off Whizpace to commercialize TV White Space radio using strong IPs that were developed in the institute since 2006.

=== South Korea ===
In South Korea, the government has supported the use of TV white space (TVWS) technologies as part of initiatives to expand rural internet access and enhance disaster communications. In 2020, the Ministry of Science and ICT selected a portable Wi-Fi device based on TVWS, developed by INNONET as an official R&D Innovation Product.

That same year, the company participated in a regulatory sandbox pilot to test wireless public internet services using TVWS on cruise ships and buses in remote areas. INNONET’s technologies have since been used internationally, including deployments in South Africa, Tanzania, and Colombia.

In September 2022, South Korea’s Ministry of Science and ICT approved a regulatory sandbox demonstration exemption for a project titled “TV White Space (TVWS)-based underground tunnel industrial accident prevention solution,” jointly proposed by a consortium led by Hyundai Engineering & Construction and INNONET. The approval was granted following review by the 23rd ICT Regulatory Sandbox Review Committee, allowing the project to proceed with field demonstrations under relaxed regulatory conditions.

The project applies TVWS-based wireless communication technology to underground construction sites, where conventional cellular relay installations are often difficult or costly due to environmental constraints. By deploying mobile TVWS transmission and reception units, the system enables wireless connectivity throughout tunnel sections without the need for extensive cabling. According to project documentation, the technology supports non-line-of-sight communication and is intended to improve situational awareness and communication between underground workers and surface control areas during construction and emergency scenarios.

In 2025, INNONET a South Korea-based ICT company, received the Silver Award in the “Innovation for Connectivity” category at the G20 MSME Digital Innovation Challenge held in Cape Town, South Africa. The company was recognized for its development of fixed and portable TVWS base stations, including satellite backhaul backpack units designed for public safety and rural connectivity. INNONET’s platforms integrate TVWS technology with smart farming, telemedicine, and construction monitoring systems to support digital inclusion and infrastructure resilience. The award highlighted the global application of TVWS in addressing connectivity gaps across rural, underground, and disaster-affected areas.

In December 2025, South Korea’s Ministry of Science and ICT granted a regulatory sandbox demonstration exemption for a TV White Space (TVWS)-based emergency mobile base station and quadruped robot service, jointly proposed by a consortium consisting of the Gyeonggi-do Fire Service Academy and INNONET. The project was intended for use in underground disaster environments, including scenarios involving disruptions to conventional mobile networks.

As part of the exemption, temporary increases in transmission power limits for mobile TVWS devices were permitted, raising the maximum output from 100 mW per 6 MHz to 1 W per 6 MHz.

=== South Africa ===
Google, in a partnership with the Independent Communications Authority of South Africa (ICASA), CSIR, Meraka Institute, the Wireless Access Providers Association (WAPA) and Carlson wireless delivers wireless access to 10 schools through 3 base stations at the campus of Stellenbosch University’s Faculty of Medicine and Health Sciences in Tygerberg, Cape Town. There was an initial trial that took place within 10 schools in order to deliver affordable internet to the selected schools in South Africa without TV interference, and to spread awareness about future TVWS technologies in South Africa. The trial took place over 10 months, from March 25, 2013, to September 25, 2013.

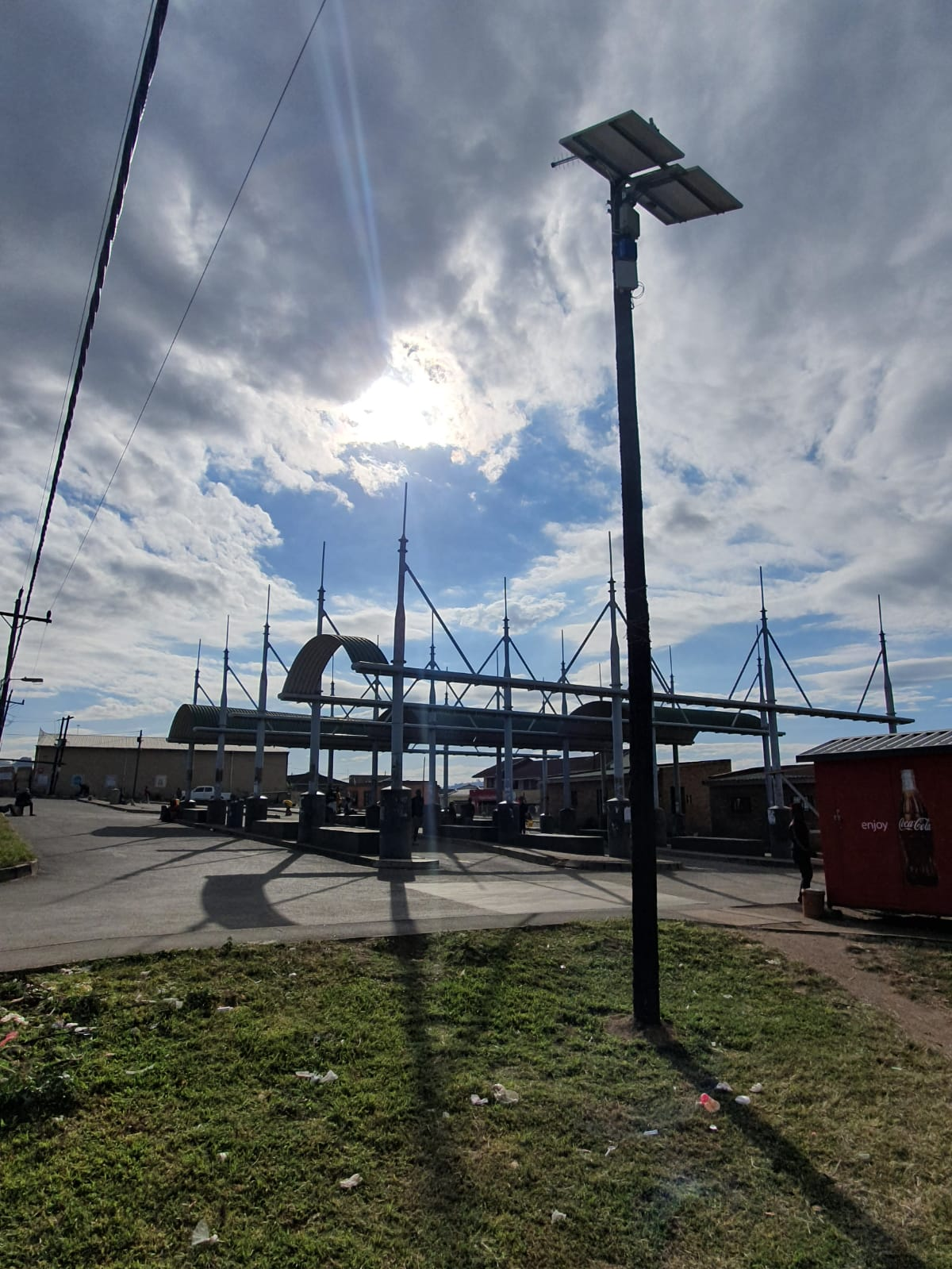
TVWS in Natal

A second trial involved providing point-to-point Internet connectivity to five rural secondary schools in Limpopo province, with equally good results.

ICASA subsequently issued regulations on the use of television white spaces in 2018. Three temporary TV white space spectrum licenses were issued by ICASA in April 2020, response to the Covid-19 pandemic, in the 470–694 MHz band, to Mthinthe Communications, Levin Global & Morai Solutions.

In 2023, South Korea-based telecommunications company INNONET partnered with the Council for Scientific and Industrial Research (CSIR) to provide 24 TV white space communication units aimed at improving internet connectivity in rural areas of South Africa. The collaboration, supported by the Korean government, included training and support for local small and medium-sized enterprises (SMMEs) to operate and manage the deployed TVWS equipment across five provinces, including Limpopo and Mpumalanga.

=== United Kingdom ===
Ofcom, the licensing body of spectrum in the UK, has made white-space free to use.

On June 29, 2011, one of the largest commercial tests of white space Wi-Fi was conducted in Cambridge, England. The trial was conducted by Microsoft using technology developed by Adaptrum and backed by a consortium of ISP's and tech companies including Nokia, BSkyB, the BBC, and BT, with the actual network hardware being provided by Neul. In the demonstration, the Adaptrum whitespace system provided the broadband IP connectivity allowing a client-side Microsoft Xbox to stream live HD videos from the Internet. Also as part of the demo, a live Xbox/Kinect video chat was established between two Xbox/Kinect units connected through the same TV whitespace connection. These applications were demonstrated under a highly challenging radio propagation environment with more than 120 dB link loss through buildings, foliage, walls, furniture, people etc. and with severe multipath effects.

In 2017, Microsoft further expanded their research to show that small cell LTE eNodeB's operating in TV White Space could be used to provide cost effective broadband to affordable housing residents.

=== United States ===
Full power analog television broadcasts, which operated between the 54 MHz and 806 MHz (54–72, 76–88, 174–216, 470–608, and 614–806) television frequencies (Channels 2-69), ceased operating on June 12, 2009, per a United States digital switchover mandate. At that time, full power TV stations were required to switch to digital transmission and operate only between 54 MHz and 698 MHz. This is also the timetable that the White Spaces Coalition has set to begin offering wireless broadband services to consumers. The delay allows time for the United States Federal Communications Commission (FCC) to test the technology and make sure that it does not interfere with existing television broadcasts. Similar technologies could be used worldwide as much of the core technology is already in place.

Theatrical producers and sports franchises hoped to derail or delay the decision, arguing that their own transmissions – whether from television signals or from wireless microphones used in live music performances – could face interference from new devices that use the white spaces. However, the FCC rejected their arguments, saying enough testing has been done, and through new regulations, possible interference will be minimized.

More of the broadcast spectrum was needed for wireless broadband Internet access, and in March 2009, Massachusetts Senator John Kerry introduced a bill requiring a study of efficient use of the spectrum. Academics have studied the matter and have promoted the idea of using computing technology to capture the benefits of the white space.

==== Trade groups ====
The White Spaces Coalition was formed in 2007 by eight large technology companies that planned to deliver high speed internet access beginning in February 2009 to United States consumers via existing white space in unused television frequencies between 54 MHz and 698 MHz (TV Channels 2-51). The coalition expected speeds of 80 Mbit/s and above, and 400 to 800 Mbit/s for white space short-range networking. The group included Microsoft, Google, Dell, HP, Intel, Philips, Earthlink, and Samsung Electro-Mechanics.

Many of the companies involved in the White Spaces Coalition were also involved in the Wireless Innovation Alliance. Another group calling itself the White Space Alliance was formed in 2011.

Google sponsored a campaign named Free the Airwaves with the purpose of switching over the white spaces that were cleared up in 2009 by the DTV conversion process by the FCC and converted to an un-licensed spectrum that can be used by Wi-Fi-like devices. The National Association of Broadcasters disapproved of the project because they claimed it would reduce the broadcast quality of their TV signals.

==== Preliminary test ====
The Federal Communications Commission's Office of Engineering and Technology released a report dated July 31, 2007, with results from its investigation of two preliminary devices submitted. The report concluded that the devices did not reliably sense the presence of television transmissions or other incumbent users, hence are not acceptable for use in their current state and no further testing was deemed necessary.

However, on August 13, 2007, Microsoft filed a document with the FCC in which it described a meeting that its engineers had with FCC engineers from the Office of Engineering and Technology on August 9 and 10. At this meeting the Microsoft engineers showed results from their testing done with identical prototype devices and using identical testing methods that "detected DTV signals at a threshold of -114 dBm in laboratory bench testing with 100 percent accuracy, performing exactly as expected." In the presence of FCC engineers, the Microsoft engineers took apart the device that the FCC had tested to find the cause of the poor performance. They found that "the scanner in the device had been damaged and operated at a severely degraded level" which explained the FCC unit's inability to detect when channels were occupied. It was also pointed out that the FCC was in possession of an identical backup prototype that was in perfect operating condition that they had not tested.

==== FCC decision ====
TV broadcasters and other incumbent users of this spectrum (both licensed and unlicensed, including makers of wireless audio systems) feared that their systems would no longer function properly if unlicensed devices were to operate in the same spectrum. However, the FCC's Office of Engineering and Technology released a report dated October 15, 2008, which evaluated prototype TV-band white spaces devices submitted by Adaptrum, The Institute for Infocomm Research, Motorola and Philips. The report concluded that these devices had met the burden of proof of concept in their ability to detect and avoid legacy transmissions, although none of the tested devices adequately detected wireless microphone signals in the presence of a digital TV transmitter on an adjacent channel.

On November 4, 2008, the FCC voted 5-0 to approve the unlicensed use of white space, thereby silencing opposition from broadcasters. The actual Second Report and Order was released ten days later and contains some serious obstacles for the development and use of TV Band Devices as they are called by FCC. Devices must both consult an FCC-mandated database to determine which channels are available for use at a given location, and must also monitor the spectrum locally once every minute to confirm that no legacy wireless microphones, video assist devices or other emitters are present. If a single transmission is detected, the device may not transmit anywhere within the entire 6 MHz channel in which the transmission was received. It was hoped that, within a year, this new access will lead to more reliable Internet access and other technologies.

On September 23, 2010, the FCC released a Memorandum Opinion and Order that determined the final rules for the use of white space for unlicensed wireless devices. The new rules removed mandatory sensing requirements which greatly facilitates the use of the spectrum with geolocation based channel allocation. The final rules adopt a proposal from the White Spaces Coalition for very strict emission rules that prevent the direct use of IEEE 802.11 (Wi-Fi) in a single channel effectively making the new spectrum unusable for Wi-Fi technologies.

==== Broadcaster lawsuit ====
On February 27, 2009, the National Association of Broadcasters (NAB) and the Association for Maximum Service Television asked a Federal court to shut down the FCC's authorization of white space wireless devices. The plaintiffs allege that portable, unlicensed personal devices operating in the same band as TV broadcasts have been proven to cause interference despite FCC tests to the contrary. The lawsuit was filed in a United States Court of Appeals for the District of Columbia Circuit. The petition for review states that the FCC's decision to allow white space personal devices "will have a direct adverse impact" on MSTV's and NAB's members, and that the Commission's decision is "arbitrary, capricious, and otherwise not in accordance with law.". A Motion to Govern the case was due to be considered on February 7, 2011. In May 2012, the NAB announced it was dropping its court challenge of rules that allow the unlicensed use of empty airwaves between existing broadcast channels.

==== Tests ====
On October 16, 2009, researchers at Microsoft Research Redmond, Washington built and deployed a white space network called WhiteFi. In this network, multiple clients connected to a single access point over UHF frequencies. The deployment included experiments to test how much data could be sent before interference became audible to nearby wireless microphones.

On February 24, 2010, officials in Wilmington, North Carolina, which was the test market for the transition to digital television, unveiled a new municipal wireless network, after a month of testing. The network used the white spaces made available by the end of analog TV. Spectrum Bridge was to work to make sure TV stations in the market do not receive interference ("no interference issues" have been reported). The smart city network will not compete with cell phone companies but will instead be used for "national purposes", including government and energy monitoring. TV Band Service, made up of private investors, has put up cameras in parks, and along highways to show traffic. Other uses include water level and quality, turning off lights in ball parks, and public Wi-Fi in certain areas. TV Band had an 18-month experimental license.

In 2011, the Yurok Tribe in Humboldt County, California began white space trials with telecommunications equipment provider Carlson Wireless of Arcata, California.

In July 2013, West Virginia University became the first university in the United States to use vacant broadcast TV channels to provide the campus and nearby areas with wireless broadband Internet service.

Also in July 2013, the Port of Pittsburgh evaluated White Space spectrum for enhancing inland waterway safety and utility with telecommunications equipment provider Metric Systems Corporation of Vista, California.

=== Tanzania ===
In 2022, South Korea-based telecommunications company INNONET conducted a pilot demonstration of TV white space (TVWS) technology in Tanzania. The demonstration, organized in partnership with the Korea Internet & Security Agency (KISA), was held during the Tanzania Annual ICT Conference (TAIC) and supported by the Korean Public Procurement Service. The project evaluated the feasibility of using TVWS for broadband deployment in rural and infrastructure-limited regions.

== See also ==
- 2008 United States wireless spectrum auction
- Digital dividend after digital television transition
- Spectrum auction
- Super Wi-Fi
- TV White Space Database
