= Open Access Network =

The Open Access Network (OAN) encourages partnerships between scholarly societies, research libraries, and other institutional partners in order to support the infrastructure of scholarly communication and support open access publishing in the humanities and social sciences. It was launched in 2015 by K|N Consultants, the not-for-profit 501(c)(3) organization which authored the well-received white paper on which the OAN is based.
