= Guard band =

Technique used to minimize interference between frequency bands

In telecommunications, a guard band is a narrow, intentionally unused frequency band that is placed between adjacent frequency bands to minimize interference between them. It is used in frequency-division multiplexing. Guard bands exist in both wired and Wireless communications.

A guard band can also be licensed for use by low-powered devices such as a private mobile phone network.
