= TV White Space Database =

TV White Space database, also commonly referred to as (TV) geolocation database, is an entity that controls the TV spectrum utilization by unlicensed white spaces devices within a determined geographical area. Its sole objective is to enable unlicensed access to white space spectrum while protecting incumbent broadcasting services. TV White Space database was first brought as a way to overcome the technical hurdles faced by spectrum sensing techniques to precisely detect very weak primary signals.

Spectrum is deemed available, or unavailable, to unlicensed usage depending on criteria that are regulator specific and thus the database operation can significantly vary between countries. Regulations on white space spectrum utilization are of extreme importance since they pose limits to the amount of white space spectrum that can be reclaimed by White Space technology for wireless broadband access. Having a certain degree of spectrum accessibility is crucial to the relevance and the successful adoption of TVWS as a technology.

The FCC and Ofcom were the first two spectrum regulators to draft rules enabling unlicensed access to unused TV spectrum in US and UK, respectively. Similar actions were taken by regulators from other countries including Industry Canada and iDA of Singapore. Currently, many companies have obtained authorization to operate geolocation databases upon successfully complying to regulatory requirements.

== Dependency on regulations ==
The amount of white space that can be reclaimed for broadband access is directly related to regulations governing white space access in a country. Currently, spectrum regulators from several countries have determined the set of rules to access white space in a secondary manner and which database operators must follow in order to be authorized for service provision. Particularly, in the US, the FCC had originally limited secondary access to white space spectrum based on a fixed transmit power rule. TV White Space was available to secondary devices provided that these kept a safe distance from the broadcaster contour, depending only on the antenna's altitude and not transmit power. This has been shown to significantly affect the amount of white space available in a country. FCC regulations on power emissions were later modified to accept a set of limited transmit powers. Several other factors also directly impact white spaces. How to process topography and the adopted radio propagation model, both being determined by regulations, have been recently shown to play a key role on the degree of white space availability of a country.
