= Gigabit wireless =

Telecommunications classification

A site with multiple Gigabit Wireless radios

Gigabit wireless is the name given to wireless communication systems whose data transfer speeds reach or exceed one gigabit (one billion bits) per second. Such speeds are achieved with complex modulations of the signal, such as quadrature amplitude modulation (QAM) or signals spanning many frequencies. When a signal spans many frequencies, physicists refer that a wide bandwidth signal. In the communication industry, many wireless internet service providers and cell phone companies deploy wireless radio frequency antennas to backhaul core networks, connect businesses, and even individual residential homes.

== Common frequencies and bands ==
In general, indoor protocols follow a cross-vendor standard and communicate in the unlicensed 2.4 GHz, 5 GHz, and (soon) 60 GHz bands.

The outdoor carrier link protocols vary widely and are not compatible across vendors (and often models from the same vendor).

Examples of frequency and bandwidths at and approaching Gigabit Wireless
Category	Frequency	Band size (MHz)	Modulations	Full Duplex capacity (Mbit/s)	Distance	References
Indoor Consumer Grade AC	5 GHz	80	IEEE 802.11ac	~200	Same room	
Outdoor PtP AC	5 GHz	80 x 2 (160)	IEEE 802.11ac	750	50 km	
Unlicensed carrier grade	24 GHz	100	256 QAM	1000	15 km	
Licensed modern carrier grade	11 GHz	100	256 QAM	750	100 km	
Carrier grade V-Band	60 GHz	125-500	64 QAM	500 - 1000	1 km - 2.4 km	
Carrier grade E-Band	80 GHz	125-1250	32 QAM	1000 - 10,000	10 km	

Note: the higher bandwidth devices require a less complex modulation to achieve high speeds.

Capable of a Symmetric Gigabit Link
Brand	Description	In Production
Mikrotik	V Band	Yes
Mimosa	licensed 11 GHz antennas, and unlicensed 5 GHz	Yes
Siklu	V and E Band	Yes
Ubiquiti	Unlicensed 5, 24 and 60 GHz	Yes
Bridgewave	V and E Band	Yes
Vubiq	V Band	Yes
Athena	V Band	No (bought by Google)
IgniteNet	Unlicensed 60 GHz + 5 GHz Failover	Yes
Facebook	V Band	R&D only

== Wireless broadband ==
Internet service providers (ISP's) are looking for ways to expand gigabit per second (Gbit/s) high-speed services to their customers. These can be achieved through fiber to the premises broadband network architecture, or a more affordable alternative using fixed wireless in the last mile in combination with the fiber networks in the middle mile in order to reduce the costs of trenching fiber optic cables to the users. In the United States, 60 GHz V band is unlicensed. This makes the V band an appealing choice to be used as fixed wireless access for Gbit/s services to connect to homes and businesses. Similarly, 70/80 GHz E band is lightly licensed which can be more accessible to more providers to provide such services.

There had been some early adopters of the hybrid fiber-wireless approach to provide Gbit/s services to customers. One of those ISP's was Webpass, a company founded in 2003 in San Francisco as a wireless ISP focusing on buildings in big cities. Since then, Webpass had been increasing the speeds along with improved wireless technologies. By 2015, Webpass offered 1 Gbit/s connections to commercial customers, however, the residential customers were limited to speeds of up to 500 Mbit/s to share the 1 Gbit/s wireless link among many residents in the same building. The company utilized a combination of various licensed and unlicensed bands.

In January 2016, a startup company Starry from Boston introduced Starry Point with the goal to provide Gbit/s speed internet wirelessly to homes. The device is a fixed wireless unit attached to a window as an access point to connect to Starry core networks using a millimetre wave band communication. The company did not reveal the details of the band, but claimed to be "the world’s first millimeter wave band active phased array technology for consumer internet communications". However, in January 2018, at the time that the company announced the expansion of its beta service to cover 3 cities: Boston, Los Angeles, and Washington, DC, the speeds were still limited to up to 200 Mbit/s.

In June 2016, Google Fiber acquired Webpass to boost its effort in its experiments with wireless technologies. As a result, Google Fiber put its effort on fiber to the premises on hold to explore more on the cheaper wireless alternative. By early 2017, the Webpass division of Google Fiber expanded 1 Gbit/s wireless service to customers in many cities in the United States.

In November 2016, Atlas Networks, an ISP that serves Seattle, deployed its V-band Gbit/s service to customers within the 750-metre (0.47-mile) to its fiber networks. The maximum throughput for each connection was 1 gigabit per second.

In October 2017, Cloudwifi, a startup ISP based in Kitchener, Ontario started using 60 GHz band fixed wireless to provide Gbit/s connectivity to customers within the 2-kilometre (1.2-mile) range of its fiber connection points.

In October 2017, Newark Fiber enabled its first customer in Newark, New Jersey with 10 Gbit/s fixed wireless service. Newark Fiber used V-band 10 Gbit/s transmitters with the distance of up to 1.8 kilometres (1.1 miles).
