= Wireless local loop =

Wireless data distribution method

Wireless local loop (WLL) is the use of a wireless communications link as the "last mile / first mile" connection for delivering plain old telephone service (POTS) or Internet access (marketed under the term "broadband") to telecommunications customers. Various types of WLL systems and technologies exist.

Other terms for this type of access include broadband wireless access (BWA), radio in the loop (RITL), fixed-radio access (FRA), fixed wireless access (FWA) and metro wireless (MW).

== Licensed Point-to-Point Microwave ==
In 2017, a company called Climate Resilient Internet, LLC, formed to develop a new standard and certification for point-to-point microwave ("fixed wireless") for enterprise and government resilience to extreme weather, grid outages and terror attacks. The company was co-founded by David Theodore, founder of Microwave Bypass, who pioneered the first use of point-to-point microwave for internet access.

== Unlicensed multi point wireless service ==
=== The growing interference problem ===
Next-Web, Etheric Networks, Gate Speed and a handful of other companies founded the first voluntary spectrum coordination, working entirely independently of government regulators. This organization was founded in March 2003 as BANC.

== Mobile technologies ==
These include Global System for Mobile Communications (GSM), time-division multiple access (TDMA), code-division multiple access (CDMA), and Digital Enhanced Cordless Telecommunications (DECT). Earlier implementations included such technologies as Advanced Mobile Phone System (AMPS).

== Deployment ==
The wireless local loop market is currently an extremely high-growth market, offering Internet service providers immediate access to customer markets without having to either lay cable through a metropolitan area, or work through the ILECs, reselling the telephone, cable or satellite networks, owned by companies that prefer to largely sell direct.

This trend revived the prospects for local and regional ISPs, as those willing to deploy fixed wireless networks were not at the mercy of the large telecommunication monopolies. They were at the mercy of unregulated re-use of unlicensed frequencies upon which they communicate.

Due to the enormous quantity of 802.11 "Wi-Fi" equipment and software, coupled with the fact that spectrum licenses are not required in the ISM and U-NII bands, the industry has moved well ahead of the regulators and the standards bodies.

== WLL methods ==
- Mobile:
  - CDMA (USA).
  - TDMA (USA).
  - GSM (ITU – Worldwide).
  - UMTS 3rd Generation (World).
  - Personal Handy-phone System (PHS in Japan, PAS/Xiaolingtong in China)
- Fixed or local area network:
  - DECT, for local loop
  - LMDS
  - IEEE 802.11, originally designed for short-range mobile Internet and network access service, it has emerged as the facto standard for wireless local loop.
  - WiMAX or IEEE 802.16 may become the dominant medium for wireless local loop. Currently more operators are running on the 802.11 MAC at 2 and 5 GHz. 802.16 was unlikely to outperform 802.11 until at least late 2008. Intel is promoting this standard, while Atheros and Broadcom are still focused largely on 802.11.
  - Satellite Internet access for autonomous building.

== Manufacturers ==
- Huawei
- Airspan
- Alvarion
- Axxcelera
- Cambridge Broadband
- Intracom Telecom
- P-Com
- Redline Communications
- Sony Ericsson
- SR Telecom

== See also ==
- 5G NR
- 8P8C (RJ-45)
- Antenna
- Basic exchange telephone radio service
- Electrical cable
- RF connector
- Wi-Fi
- Microwave Bypass
- Wireless Internet service provider (WISP)
