= Dreamtilt =

Australian Internet service provider

Dreamtilt Pty. Ltd.
- Type: Private
- Industry: Telecommunication
- Founded: Gladstone, Queensland, Australia (10 October 1999)
- Headquarters: Gladstone, Australia
- Area served: Gladstone, Queensland, Australia
- Key people: Adrian Robertson (Director)
- Products: Wireless Broadband; Webhosting; VoIP; Web Design; Cloud Hosted PBX Systems
- Number of employees: >5 (2014)
- Website: www.dreamtilt.com.au

Dreamtilt is an Australian Internet service provider, founded on 10 October 1999. The ISP focuses primarily on Fixed Wireless-based Internet access, making it a Wireless Internet service provider. Dreamtilt also provides web hosting, web design, Voice over IP, and a variety of related services.

Dreamtilt provides Internet and VoIP services over the wireless network in Gladstone, Queensland and does not require access to the fixed-line telephone network.

== Dreamtilt Service Offerings ==
=== General ===
Dreamtilt is based in Gladstone, Queensland. The company has a range of services covering different areas:

- Wireless broadband (Gladstone and surrounding areas only - Residential, Business and Industry plans available)
- Web hosting
- VoIP
- IP PBX Systems

== Wireless Broadband ==
Dreamtilt Fixed Wireless Broadband does not require a phone line or line rental. Using a number of tower locations around Gladstone, the customer can access the wireless network as long as there is LoS (Line-of-sight) available. Some customers may require the addition of a booster dish to increase signal strength.

Dreamtilt also provides a VoIP service that allows the customer to make and receive phone calls over the wireless network, thereby removing the need to have a phone line activated at their residence.

== VoIP and Cloud Hosted PBX Systems ==
Dreamtilt operates a VoIP service for business and residential customers that offers low cost, distance independent telephony services. It also hosts Cloud Hosted PBX systemes based for Gladstone Businesses.

== Web Hosting ==
Whilst Dreamtilt focuses on providing hosting for local businesses in Gladstone, they have provided services to customers from all parts of Australia. Dreamtilt Web Hosting Servers utilize cPanel, providing customers full control over their web hosting in a simple graphical interface.
