= Starry Internet =

Wireless broadband Internet service provider

Starry, Inc.
- Type: Private
- Industry: Telecommunications
- Founded: January 2016
- Founder: Chet Kanojia
- Headquarters: Boston, Massachusetts, USA
- Area served: Various US cities
- Key people: Chet Kanojia (Founder and CEO)
- Products: Wireless broadband internet
- Parent: Verizon (2026–present)
- Website: Official website

Starry Internet is a fixed wireless broadband Internet service provider (ISP or WISP) operated by Starry, Inc., using millimeter-band LMDS connections, sometimes categorized as 5G fixed wireless, to connect its base stations to customer buildings. Starry currently operates within Boston, New York City, Los Angeles, Denver, Washington, D.C., and Columbus, Ohio.

== Background and availability ==
Starry, Inc. was publicly announced in January 2016 by Chaitanya "Chet" Kanojia, who had previously founded Aereo. As of December 2017, it was providing commercial service to a limited number of apartment buildings in the Boston area for $50/month per apartment, promising 200 Mbit/s upload and download speeds. As of December 2016, Starry was based in Boston, had about 100 employees, and had raised $63 million of funding. Kanojia claims that Starry's capital cost will be only $25 per home, as compared to $2,500 for cable. Starry announced on July 1, 2019, that through an FCC spectrum auction, they acquired 104 licenses for 24 GHz millimeter-wave spectrum to cover 51 markets in 25 states.

Starry's system operates on the 37.1, 37.3 and 37.5 GHz bands, connecting its base stations ("Starry Beam") to receivers on individual buildings ("Starry Points"). Each base station covers a radius of 1.5 km. Signal propagation is near line-of-sight, not penetrating buildings and windows, and is degraded by foliage or rain, so Starry directs its signal using Multi-user MIMO phased array antennas, and can take advantage of reflections. The base station redistributes its signal within a building using Starry's own Wi-Fi router ("Starry Station").

== Critical reception ==
Analysts are mixed about Starry's prospects. Some point to the failure of Clearwire (which operated WiMAX on the 2.5 GHz band), or to technical challenges: "The physics are tough to overcome, and technology has been slow to improve here." Others note that if the expected low fixed costs per user are achieved, "they could profitably offer competitive broadband speeds for a fraction of the current price of wired broadband".

== 2022 First Mark Acquisition Corp Merger ==
In March 2022, Starry Internet completed a SPAC deal with First Mark Acquisition Corp in order to go public.

== Financial issues ==
On 20 October 2022, Starry, Inc., filed a "WARN" notice with New York State's Department of Labor announcing the layoffs of "49 employees" because of "Changes in business operational needs as result of financial difficulties".

On 23 December 2022, commercial real estate company Farley-White announced that it was suing Starry for $120,000 in unpaid rent.

On February 20, 2023, Starry filed for Chapter 11 bankruptcy.

After emerging from Chapter 11 bankruptcy, Starry, Inc. was acquired by Verizon in October 2025. The deal was expected to close in late 2026.
