= NEARnet =

NEARnet (New England Academic and Research Network) was an innovative high-speed regional network for education, research and development, established in 1988 by a consortium led by Boston University, Harvard University, and MIT. It was a precursor to the commercial internet, formed after DARPA announced plans to dismantle the ARPANET. ARPANET then accounted for 71 of the consortium's 258 host connections.

Special services and facilities, such as the Connection Machine, the Massachusetts Microelectronics Center, and library catalogs, were made available over NEARnet. By 1990, NEARnet had 40 members.

== Technology ==
NEARnet was linked to NSFNet via the John von Neumann Center supercomputer center and extended its backbone using the world's first fixed wireless internet technology, then referred to as, "LAN extension over microwave". The tech was developed and provided by wireless pioneer and Cambridge neighbor, Microwave Bypass.

The microwave was a core technology, which met the highest internet speed of 10 Mbps and helped to fund the network by eliminating recurring transmission charges. It consisted of an analog 23GHz, licensed, point-to-point microwave link, modified for a 10MHz baseband carrier and mated to an 802.3 Ethernet transceiver/microwave interface ("EtherWave Transceiver"). The EtherWave then connected network segments and backbones through Cisco routers. Smaller, more remote NEARnet members joined the network through T1 leased lines.

On July 1, 1993, NEARnet operations were assumed by BBN Systems and Technologies under contract to MIT. BBN's Internet operations were eventually merged with GTE.
