= Fixed wireless =

Wireless communication used to connect fixed locations

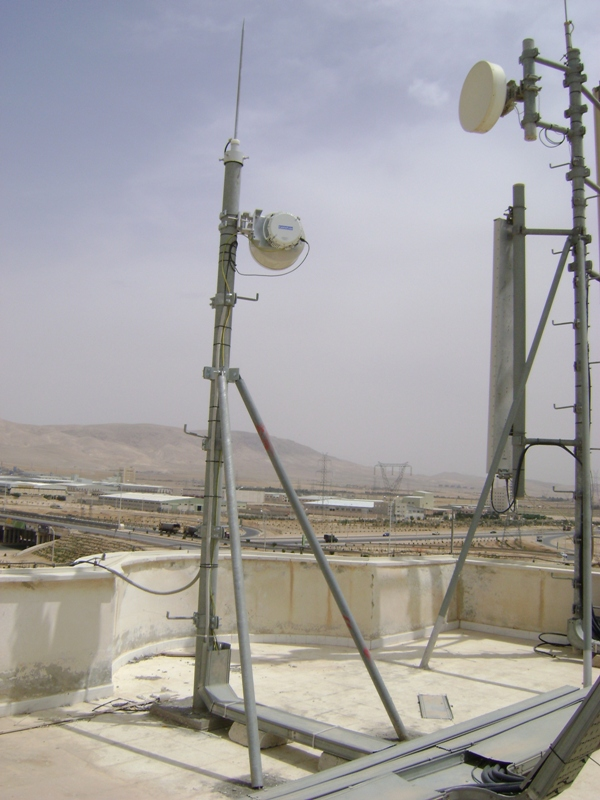
CableFree Fixed Wireless Microwave Backhaul links deployed for mobile operators in the Middle East. These microwave links typically carry a mix of Ethernet /IP, TDM (Nx E1) and SDH traffic to connect sites with high capacity. Such microwave links used to carry 2xE1 (4 Mbit/s) now carry 800 Mbit/s or more, using modern 1024QAM or higher modulation schemes.

Fixed wireless is the operation of wireless communication devices or systems used to connect two fixed locations (e.g., building to building or tower to building) with a radio or other wireless link, such as laser bridge. Usually, fixed wireless is part of a wireless LAN infrastructure. The purpose of a fixed wireless link is to enable data communications between the two sites or buildings. Fixed wireless data (FWD) links are often a cost-effective alternative to leasing fiber or installing cables between the buildings.

The point-to-point signal transmissions occur through the air over a terrestrial microwave platform rather than through copper or optical fiber; therefore, fixed wireless does not require satellite feeds or local telephone service. The advantages of fixed wireless include the ability to connect with users in remote areas without the need for laying new cables and the capacity for broad bandwidth that is not impeded by fiber or cable capacities. Fixed wireless devices usually derive their electrical power from the public utility mains, unlike mobile wireless or portable wireless devices which tend to be battery powered.

== Antennas ==
Fixed wireless services typically use a directional radio antenna on each end of the signal (e.g., on each building). These antennas are generally larger than those seen in Wi-Fi setups and are designed for outdoor use. Several types of radio antennas are available that accommodate various weather conditions, signal distances and bandwidths. They are usually selected to make the beam as narrow as possible and thus focus transmit power to their destination, increasing reliability and reducing the chance of eavesdropping or data injection. The links are usually arranged as a point-to-point setup to permit the use of these antennas. This also permits the link to have better speed and or better reach for the same amount of power.

These antennas are typically designed to be used in the unlicensed ISM band radio frequency bands (900 MHz, 1.8 GHz, 2.4 GHz and 5 GHz), however, in most commercial installations, licensed frequencies may be used to ensure quality of service (QoS) or to provide higher connection speeds.

== Broadband ==
Businesses and homes can use fixed-wireless antenna technology to access broadband Internet and Layer 2 networks using fixed wireless broadband. Networks that have redundancy and saturation and antennas that can aggregate signal from multiple carriers are able to offer fail-over and redundancy for connectivity not generally afforded by wired connections. In rural areas where wired infrastructure is not yet available, fixed-wireless broadband can be a viable option for Internet access.

== See also ==
- Internet access
- Mobile wireless communication
- Mobile broadband
- Microwave Bypass
- Ethernet bridge
- Wireless ISP
