= Wireless Internet service provider =

Internet service provider with a network based on wireless networking

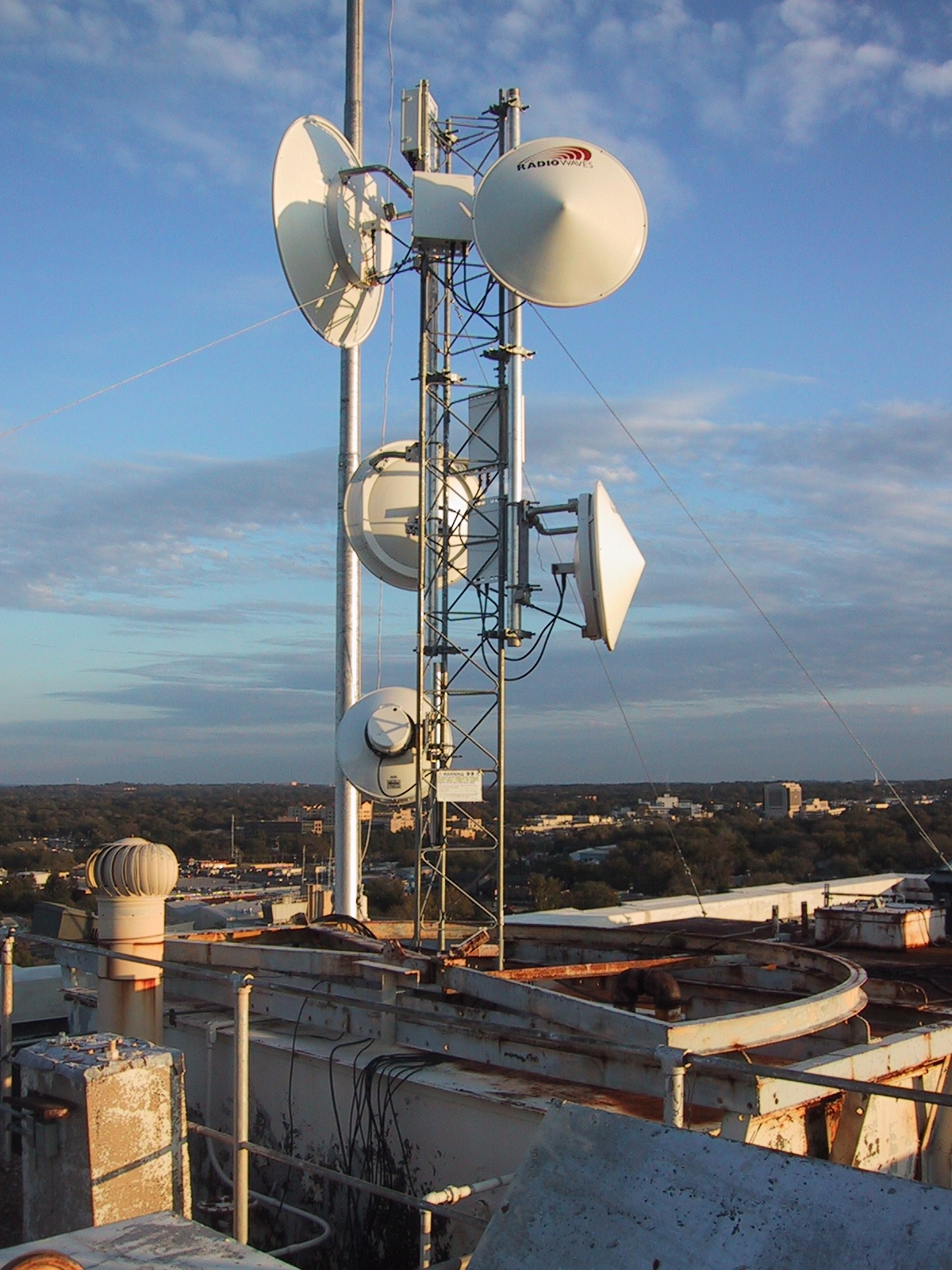
Aspen Communication's wireless access point in Tyler, Texas

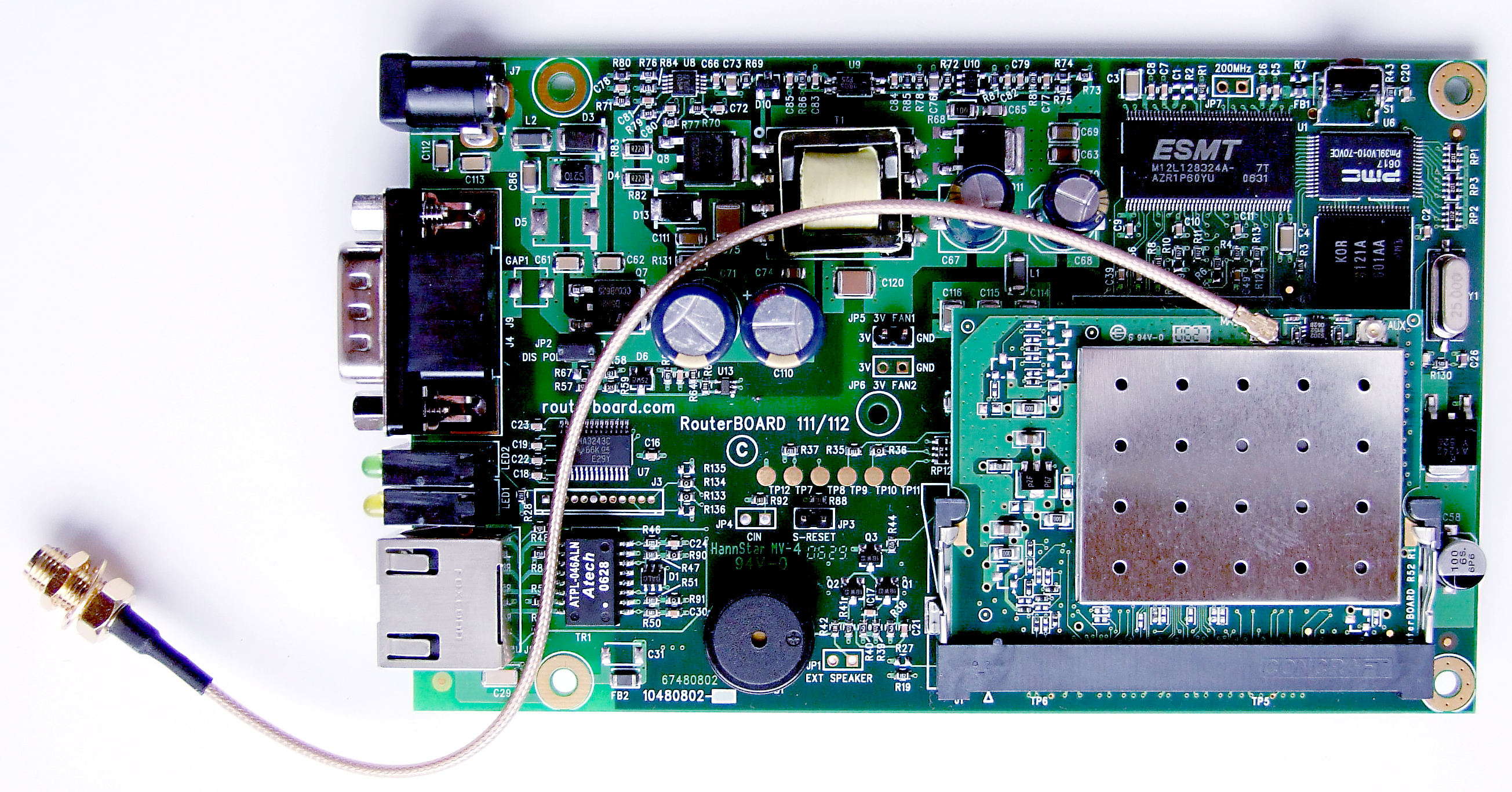
An embedded RouterBoard 112 with U.FL-RSMA pigtail and R52 miniPCI Wi-Fi card widely used by WISPs in the Czech Republic

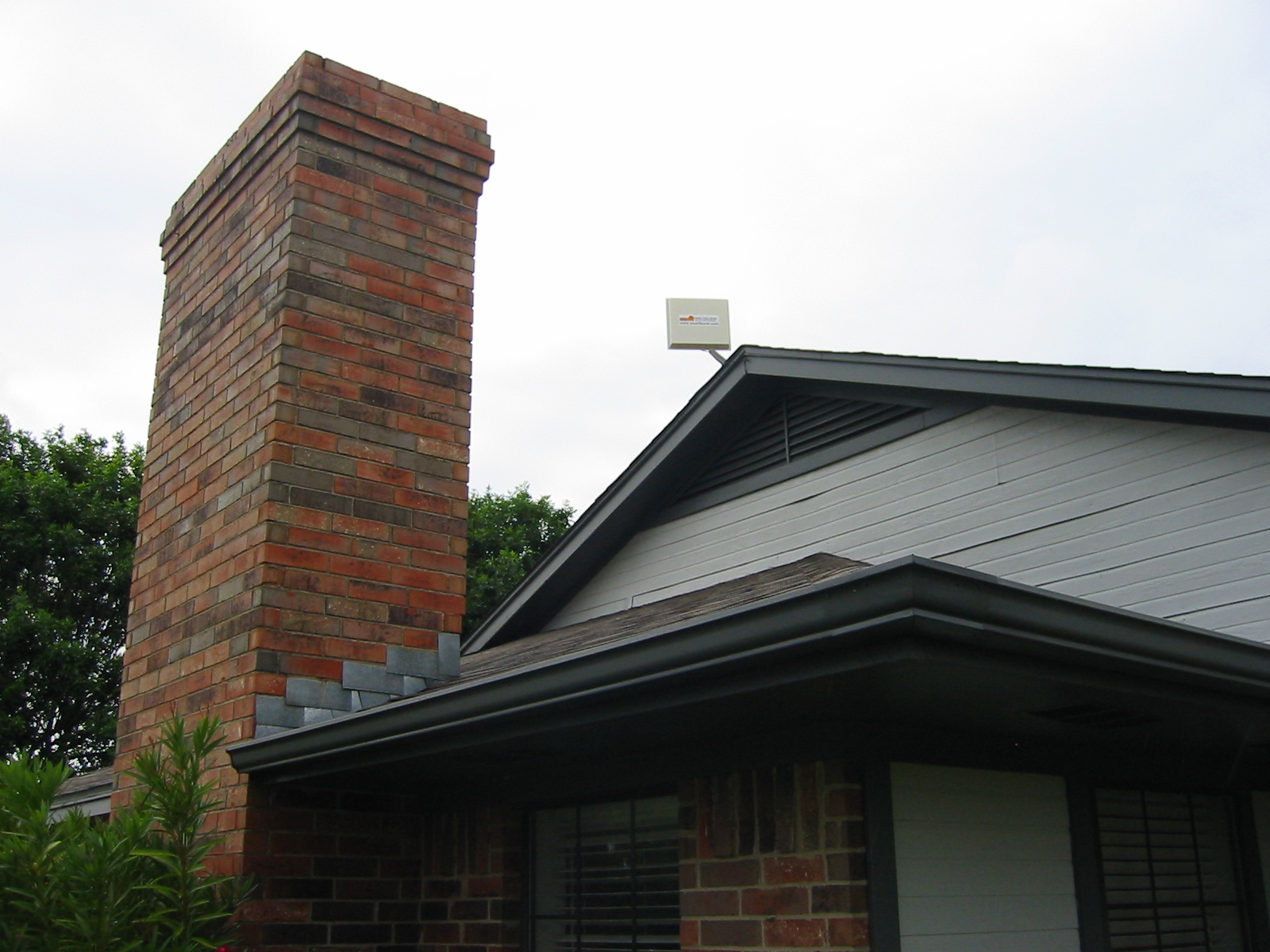
Typical WISP Customer-premises equipment (CPE) installed on a residence.

A wireless Internet service provider (WISP) is an Internet service provider with a network based on wireless networking. Technology may include commonplace Wi-Fi wireless mesh networking, or proprietary equipment designed to operate over open 900 MHz, 2.4 GHz, 4.9, 5, 24, and 60 GHz bands or licensed frequencies in the UHF band (including the MMDS frequency band), LMDS, and other bands from 6 GHz to 80 GHz.

In the US, the Federal Communications Commission (FCC) released a Report and Order (FCC 05-56) in 2005 that revised the FCC’s rules to open the 3650 MHz band for terrestrial wireless broadband operations. On November 14, 2007 the Commission released a Public Notice (DA 07-4605) in which the Wireless Telecommunications Bureau announced the start date for the licensing and registration process for the 3650–3700 MHz band.

As of July 2015, over 2,000 fixed wireless broadband providers operate in the US, servicing nearly 4 million customers.

== History ==
Initially, WISPs were only found in rural areas not covered by cable television or DSL. There were 879 Wi-Fi based WISPs in the Czech Republic as of May 2008, making it the country with most Wi-Fi access points in the whole EU.; which was a consequence of the then de facto monopoly of the former telecom operator on fixed data networks. The providing of wireless Internet has a big potential of lower the "digital gap" or "Internet gap" in the developing countries. Geekcorps actively help in Africa with among others wireless network building. An example of a typical WISP system is such as the one deployed by Gaiacom Wireless Networks which is based on Wi-Fi standards. The One Laptop per Child project strongly relies on good Internet connectivity, which can most likely be provided in rural areas only with satellite or wireless network Internet access. In high internet cost countries such as South Africa, prices have been drastically reduced by the government allocating spectrum to smaller WISPs, who are able to deliver high speed broadband at a much lower cost.

Some WISP networks have been started in rural parts of the United Kingdom, to address issues with poor broadband DSL service (bandwidth) in rural areas ("notspots"), including slow rollout of fibre based services which could improve service (usually Fibre to the cabinet to groups of rural buildings, potentially Fibre to the premises for isolated buildings). A number of these WISPs have been set up via the Community Broadband Network, using funds from the European Agricultural Fund for Rural Development

== Overview ==
WISPs often offer additional services like location-based content, Virtual Private Networking (VPN) and Voice over IP. Isolated municipal ISPs and larger statewide initiatives alike are tightly focused on wireless networking.

WISPs have a large market share in rural environments where cable and digital subscriber lines are not available; further, with technology available, they can meet or beat speeds of legacy cable and telephone systems. In urban environments, gigabit wireless links are common and provide levels of bandwidth previously only available through expensive fiber optic connections.

Typically, the way that a WISP operates is to order a fiber circuit to the center of the area they wish to serve. From there, the WISP builds backhauls (gigabit wireless or fiber) to elevated points in the region, such as radio towers, tall buildings, grain silos, or water towers. Those locations have access points to provide service to individual customers, or backhauls to other towers where they have more equipment. The WISP may also use gigabit wireless links to connect a PoP (Point of Presence) to several towers, reducing the need to pay for fiber circuits to the tower. For fixed wireless connections, a small dish or other antenna is mounted to the roof of the customer's building and aligned to the WISP's nearest antenna site. Where a WISP operates over the tightly limited range of the heavily populated 2.4 GHz band, as nearly all 802.11-based Wi‑Fi providers do, it is not uncommon to also see access points mounted on light posts and customer buildings.

Roaming between service providers is possible with the draft protocol WISPr, a set of recommendations that facilitate inter-network and inter-operator roaming of Wi-Fi users.

== Technology problems ==
- Line-of-sight and non-line-of-sight propagation

== See also ==
- Mobile broadband
- Neighborhood Internet service provider (NISP)
- Satellite Internet access
- Wireless community network
- Wireless local loop

=== Specific entities ===
- Airspan Networks
- ConnectKentucky
- Geekcorps
- Microwave Bypass
- Motorola Canopy
- Radwin
- Starry Internet
- Telrad Networks
