= Optical wireless =

Combination of fiber and radio frequency communications

Optical wireless is the combined use of "optical" (optical fibre) and "wireless" (radio frequency) communication to provide telecommunication to clusters of end points which are geographically distant. The high capacity optical fibre is used to span the longest distances. A lower cost wireless link carries the signal for the last mile to nearby users.

== See also ==
- 4.5G / 5G
