= ConnectKentucky =

ConnectKentucky is a partnership of private firms and the Commonwealth of Kentucky that aims to make broadband Internet access available throughout the state. Primarily funded through county, local, and federal grant programs, the 501(c)(3) organization's CEO, Brian Mefford, aims to make broadband connections of at least 768 kbit/s accessible to "100 percent of Kentucky homes." The organization is headquartered in Bowling Green, Kentucky, but has attracted attention from Washington lawmakers. Noted technologist and Congressman Rick Boucher said of the project: "If it works in Kentucky, in such a rural state, I think it could provide wonders nationwide."

Due in part to the largely public nature of the program, government sponsored programs such as "No Child Left Offline," targeted at ensuring Internet access to school children, and requirements in various bidding process. Proposals include requirements for integrating these new networks with those of local governments, ranging from providing proprietary services aimed at first-responders to providing wireless backbones to educational institutions.

Subdivided by region, some daughter projects include plans for major wireless rollouts. One such project, ConnectGRADD, focuses upon the largely rural Green River Area Development District, consisting of Daviess, Hancock, Henderson, McLean, Ohio, Union and Webster counties. Their fiscal courts intend to use considerable sums of coal severance and slightly smaller new debts to ensure their residents have access to WISP service that meets the minimum 768 kbit/s called for by the statewide program. The two relatively populous areas, Owensboro and Henderson, both have local municipally owned wireless ISPs that largely met the goals of ConnectKentucky within and near their city limits prior to its conception. These ISPs both operate over unlicensed spectra, largely centered on Alvarion-branded pre-WiMAX equipment, and compete with cable and telecommunications providers for the urban marketplace. However, all but one of the four smaller counties were home to less than 16,000 people at the 2000 Census, and none had a population of over 23,000. These areas are largely underserved prior the ConnectGRADD rollout: Only 20% of households in Webster County, for instance, were subscribed to broadband Internet services, compared with a 32% state average in 2005. Only a trivial 15% of the households of Ohio County were being served, and even the heaviest adopters, Henderson County, were only subscribing to such services from 29% of homes.

ConnectKentucky, as well as its national offshoot Connected Nation, is heavily criticized by telecommunications policy experts for its model of research and mapping, lack of citizen involvement, and potential financial ties to AT&T and former Bell companies.
