= Pcom =

Pcom or PCOM may refer to:

- Pcom Network, an Internet Service Provider based in Tehran Province, Iran
- P-Com, a defunct radio-networking manufacturer
- Pacific College of Oriental Medicine (Pacific College of Health and Science)
- Philadelphia College of Osteopathic Medicine, in the United States
- Posterior communicating artery, a blood vessel in the brain often referred to as the 'p-com'
- Prison Commission (England and Wales)
