= P-Com =

Radio networking equipment manufacturer

Corporate logo

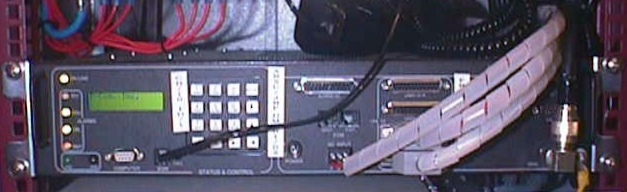
Tel-Link 23 Indoor Unit installed in a 19-inch rack

P-Com Corporation was a manufacturer of point-to-point and point-to-multipoint radios in the late 1990s and early 2000s. The company banked on providing wireless local loop and bandwidth facilities to metropolitan and remote areas, using fixed antennas and Asynchronous Transfer Mode technology. At its peak, the company had operations at Campbell, California, Melbourne, Florida, the United Kingdom, and an active client presence in Argentina. The company stock had an IPO of $25 in the late 1990s: by the mid-2000s, this had become a penny stock, and several waves of layoffs decimated the workforce by that time.

P-Com acquired the wireless division of Cylink Corporation in early 1998, rebranding as P-Com Wireless Access Group, and incorporating the M100 and M400 products of its earlier acquisition ACS.

A number of UK staff, including senior management and engineers left P-Com in 2002 to set up rival Fresnel Microwave Systems. Fresnel was later purchased by Centerpoint Corporation.

Faced with fierce competition to its millimeter-wave point-to-point products, the company re-focused itself on the license-free product line and the expertise it had acquired from Cylink in 1998. Rival Wave Wireless of Sarasota FL was purchased in 2005, and P-Com restructured and rebranded itself Wave Wireless in 2005.

Wave Wireless contracted with B&B Test Solutions to manufacture all of their SpeedLAN wireless products. In November, 2006, B&B Test Solutions acquired the AirPro Gold “carrier class” wireless product line from Wave Wireless. In August, 2007, B&B Test Solutions acquired all of the rights to the SpeedLAN product line from Wave Wireless, which appears to have ceased operations.

In October 2009, B&B Test Solutions/Wave Wireless were acquired by Mountain Optech, who have then changed their name to Mountain Secure Systems.

== Trivia ==
The "P" stood for "Personal" in the name. The company was formed in California (fact: 7/09).
