= CALLUP net =

Israel-based telecommunications company

CALLUP
- Company type: Subsidiary
- Traded as: TASE: ONE (parent company)
- Industry: Telecommunications
- Founded: 1999; 27 years ago
- Headquarters: Tel Aviv, Israel
- Area served: International
- Key people: Alon Roth, CEO
- Products: Value-added services, mobile device management, generic Access Network, roaming
- Parent: One Software Technologies Ltd
- Website: www.callup.net

Callup is an Israeli telecommunications company that provides communication software and services internationally. Headquartered in Israel, CALLUP is a subsidiary of publicly traded One Software Technologies (TASE: ONE).

== History ==
Callup was founded in 1999. The company began by providing services to telecom providers such as voicemail services.

In 2000, it partnered with Unefón, Mexico's largest mobile phone operator. By 2003, Callup had entered into agreement with Unefón to supply 1.3 million of that company's subscribers with instant messaging service, a deal valued at $2.7 million.

In 2005, Callup purchased Mediagate from Telrad Networks. The purchase expanded Callup's Unified Messaging System (UMS), Multimedia Messaging Service (MMS), and SMS customers to approximately 5 million worldwide. Mediagate is recognized as the inventor of unified messaging and was one of Callup's main competitors prior to the purchase. In 2006, it earned one of its largest projects when it partnered with the German conglomerate Siemens.

Callup expanded to approximately 20 employees in 2008 with earnings of approximately $3 million. The same year, it purchased Vimatix, a provider for mobile. The purchase allowed Callup to expand its mobile operations using Vimatix's platforms including multimedia content delivery in 2.5G and 3G networks.

In 2012, Callup added former VocalTec and Comverse Technology executive Alon Roth to its executive team. In 2014, the company launched CanVAS in the Cloud, a set of cloud-based value added services for mobile providers. In the same year, Callup entered into an agreement with Hot Mobile and YouPhone to provide its over the air technology through its SIM OTA platform. In 2015 it was also selected by a major cellular operator in a European country.
