= Fast Dormancy =

Fast Dormancy, or FD, is a mobile technology feature designed to reduce battery consumption and network utilization between mobile devices and their respective carrier networks during periods of data inactivity. It is currently implemented by monitoring the activity level of the mobile device and setting it to a control channel and power state appropriate for its level of activity. Each state results in different power consumption and network throughput while allowing a consistent data connection to be maintained. It is standardized by the 3rd Generation Partnership Project (3GPP) and implemented by most mobile carriers as a standard feature. Fast Dormancy is required to be supported by both the device and the carrier network in order for it to function.

== History ==
The concept of idling data connectivity for lower power consumption and improved battery life has been a common subject of discussion and public attention as the demand for mobile data use increases and newer wireless technologies are developed and used by carrier networks. Prior to the development and publication of the Fast Dormancy feature, earlier versions of the 3GPP specifications did not formally standardize an in-depth method to accomplish data connectivity idling. One method that was commonly implemented, "Autonomous Signalling Connection Release", attempted to address data connection idling by allowing devices to establish a data connection only when active data transfers were being executed. After the execution completed, the data connection was immediately terminated. This method resulted in a significant increase in signalling traffic, as devices had to re-establish a data connection each time data was to be sent or received. Carriers who implemented the method reported decreased network performance and increased Core Delivery Network overhead, and reported that systematic, network, and monetary investments were needed in order to adequately service requests and maintain the feature.

Release 8.0 of the 3GPP specifications, published in 2010, standardized the data connection idling process and replaced earlier methods such as "Autonomous Signalling Connection Release" with Fast Dormancy. The Fast Dormancy feature resolved the issues reported by mobile carriers by implementing different states that set the level of power consumption and data throughput that the device can utilize. This allows for the device to maintain a consistent connection between data transfers while reducing battery consumption during periods of inactivity. The term Fast Dormancy was coined as a short-hand way of describing its main purpose, which is to quickly put mobile devices into a dormant data connectivity state and reduce power consumption.

== Technical details ==
=== Device states ===
Beginning with Release 8.0 of Fast Dormancy, device states are used to set power consumption and data throughput during periods of inactivity. The standard device states specified by Fast Dormancy are as follows:

- DCH (Dedicated Channel) - The state that allows for maximum data connectivity throughput data transfer speeds, hence allowing for full power consumption as if Fast Dormancy was completely turned off.
- FACH (Forward Access Channel) - Devices are switched to this channel state when the data transfer rate is low enough where using the DCH would render no benefit. This channel state requires less power consumption compared to the DCH state. Devices are automatically switched back to the DCH state if the data transfer rate begins to exceed the maximum throughput possible with FACH and DCH becomes beneficial.
- PCH (Paging Channel) - The lowest data connectivity state. Devices are typically switched to this state when no data transfers are in progress. It keeps the data connection active between the device and the carrier network and allows for data transfers to quickly begin without requiring the device to execute the typical connection procedures and re-connect to the network.
- IDLE_CCCH (Idle and using the Common Control Channel) - Used during prolonged data inactivity. No data connectivity is established, but the device remains on the Common Control Channel (CCH) so that call paging, call origination, and other non-data protocols can still function.
- IDLE - Used when the connection has dropped or no connection can be found. This is the lowest power consumption state.

== See also ==
- DCH IP Multimedia Subsystem
- FACH Base station subsystem
- PCH Transmission (telecommunications)
- Mobile phone
