= Etheric Networks =

Etheric Networks Incorporated
- Company type: Privately held corporation
- Industry: Internet & Communications
- Founded: 2000
- Headquarters: San Mateo, California
- Key people: W.Alexander Hagen, CEO
- Products: Internet service
- Website: ethericnetworks.com

Etheric Networks is an Internet service provider based in San Mateo, California serving the San Francisco Bay Area. It specializes in high-speed Internet access using wireless technologies. Fixed wireless towers using ISM and U-NII band transmissions connect end users to its fiber optic backbone.

== History ==
In March 2003, Etheric Networks launches ISP service via its first generation broadband fixed wireless local loop WLL access network, via the Qwest co-location center in Sunnyvale and Black Mountain, a communication tower complex at 2,800 feet above sea level, overlooking Silicon Valley and the Peninsula.
