= Captive portal =

Web page displayed to new users of a network

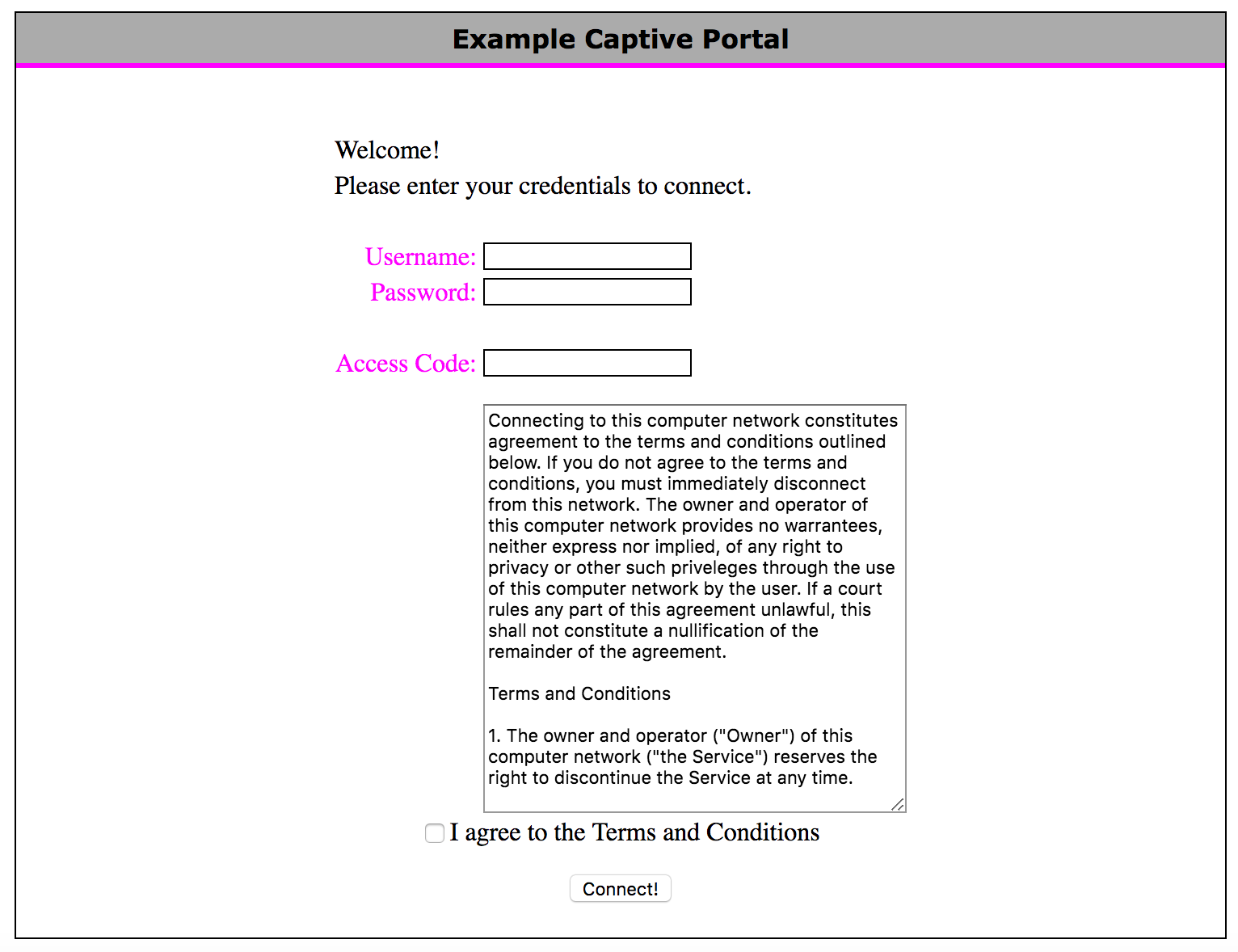
An example of a captive web portal used to log onto a restricted network

A captive portal is a web page accessed with a web browser that is displayed to newly connected users of a Wi-Fi or wired network before they are granted broader access to network resources. Captive portals are commonly used to present a landing or log-in page which may require authentication, payment, acceptance of an end-user license agreement/acceptable use policy, or survey completion. Captive portals are used for a broad range of mobile and pedestrian broadband services – including cable and both commercially provided Wi-Fi and home hotspots. A captive portal can also be used to provide access to enterprise or residential wired networks, such as apartment houses, hotel rooms, and business centers.

The captive portal is presented to the client and is stored either at the gateway or on a web server hosting the web page. Depending on the feature set of the gateway, websites or TCP ports can be allow-listed so that the user would not have to interact with the captive portal in order to use them. The MAC address of attached clients can also be used to bypass the login process for specified devices.

WISPr refers to this web-browser–based authentication method as the Universal Access Method (UAM).

== Uses ==
Captive portals are primarily used in open wireless networks where the users are shown a welcome message informing them of the conditions of access (allowed ports, liability, etc.). Administrators tend to do this so that their own users take responsibility for their actions and to avoid any legal responsibility. Whether this delegation of responsibility is legally valid is a matter of debate. Some networks may also require entering the user's cell phone number or identity information so that administrators can provide information to authorities in case there was illegal activity on the network.

Often captive portals are used for marketing and commercial communication purposes. Access to the Internet over open Wi-Fi is prohibited until the user exchanges personal data by filling out a web-based registration form in a web browser. The web-based form either automatically opens in a web browser, or appears when the user opens a web browser and tries to visit any web page. In other words, the user is "captive" - unable to access the Internet freely until the user is granted access to the Internet and has "completed" the captive portal. This allows the provider of this service to display or send advertisements to users who connect to the Wi-Fi access point. This type of service is also sometimes known as "social Wi-Fi", as they may ask for a social network account to login (such as Facebook). Over the past few years, such social Wi-Fi captive portals have become commonplace with various companies offering marketing centered around Wi-Fi data collection.

The user can find many types of content in the captive portal, and it's common to allow access to the Internet in exchange for viewing content or performing a certain action (often, providing personal data to enable commercial contact); thus, the marketing use of the captive portal is a tool for lead generation (business contacts or potential clients).

== Implementation ==
There are various ways to implement a captive portal.

=== HTTP redirect ===
A common method is to direct all World Wide Web traffic to a web server, which returns an HTTP redirect to a captive portal. When a modern, Internet-enabled device first connects to a network, it sends out an HTTP request to a detection URL predefined by its vendor and expects an HTTP status code 200 OK or 204 No Content. If the device receives an HTTP 2xx status code, it assumes it has unlimited internet access. Captive portal prompts are displayed if the device receives a 302 redirect status code to the captive portal instead. RFC 6585 specifies the 511 Network Authentication Required status code.

=== ICMP redirect ===
Client traffic can also be redirected using ICMP redirect on the layer 3 level.

=== Redirect by DNS ===
When a client requests a resource on a remote host by name, DNS is queried to resolve that hostname. In a captive portal, the firewall will make sure that only the DNS server(s) provided by the network's DHCP can be used by unauthenticated clients (or, alternatively, it will forward all DNS requests by unauthenticated clients to that DNS server). This DNS server will return the IP address of the captive portal page as a result of all DNS lookups.

In order to perform redirection by DNS the captive portal uses DNS hijacking to perform an action similar to a man-in-the-middle attack. To limit the impact of DNS poisoning, a TTL of 0 is typically used.

=== Captive Portal API ===
RFC 8910 introduces a standardized method for networks to inform clients about the presence of RFC 8908 Captive Portal API endpoints using DHCP (both IPv4 and DHCPv6) options and IPv6 NDP router advertisements. RFC 8910 was implemented in systemd-networkd v254 in July 2023. NetworkManager discussions have also explored using them for captive portal interactions.

== Detection ==
Captive portal detection URLs typically return a minimal, standardized response when not behind a captive portal. When the device receives the expected response, it concludes that it has direct internet access. If the response is different, the device assumes it is behind a captive portal and triggers the captive portal login process.

Platform	Test URL	Expected response
Apple (MacOS/iOS Family)	Current: http://captive.apple.com/hotspot-detect.html	HTML with "Success" in both the title and body text.
Apple (MacOS/iOS Family)	Legacy: http://www.apple.com/library/test/success.html	HTML with "Success" in both the title and body text.
Google (Android/ChromeOS)	http://connectivitycheck.gstatic.com/generate_204	HTTP status code 204 with an empty body
Google (Android/ChromeOS)	http://clients3.google.com/generate_204	HTTP status code 204 with an empty body
Windows	Current (Windows 10 1607 and later): http://www.msftconnecttest.com/connecttest.txt	"Microsoft Connect Test" (plain text)
Windows	Legacy (Prior to Windows 10 1607): http://www.msftncsi.com/ncsi.txt	"Microsoft NCSI" (plain text)
NetworkManager (GNOME)	http://nmcheck.gnome.org/check_network_status.txt	"NetworkManager is online" (plain text)
NetworkManager (KDE Plasma)	http://networkcheck.kde.org/	"OK" (plain text)
Firefox	http://detectportal.firefox.com/canonical.html	"<meta http-equiv="refresh" content="0;url=https://support.mozilla.org/kb/captive-portal"/>" (HTML)
Firefox	http://firefox-portal-detection.com/generate_204	HTTP status code 204 with an empty body
GrapheneOS	Default: http://connectivitycheck.grapheneos.network/generate_204	HTTP status code 204 with an empty body
GrapheneOS	Fallback: http://grapheneos.online/gen_204	HTTP status code 204 with an empty body
GrapheneOS	Other fallback: http://grapheneos.online/generate_204	HTTP status code 204 with an empty body

== Limitations ==
=== Security ===
Captive portals have been known to have incomplete firewall rule sets – such as outbound ports being left open – that allow clients to circumvent the portal.

==== DNS tunneling ====
In some deployments, the rule set will route DNS requests from clients to the Internet, or the provided DNS server will fulfill arbitrary DNS requests from the client. This allows a client to bypass the captive portal and access the open Internet by tunneling arbitrary traffic within DNS packets.

==== Automatic submission ====
Some captive portals may be configured to allow appropriately equipped user agents to detect the captive portal and automatically authenticate. User agents and supplemental applications such as Apple's Captive Portal Assistant can sometimes transparently bypass the display of captive portal content against the wishes of the service operator as long as they have access to correct credentials, or they may attempt to authenticate with incorrect or obsolete credentials, resulting in unintentional consequences such as accidental account locking.

==== MAC spoofing ====
A captive portal that uses MAC addresses to track connected devices can sometimes be circumvented by re-using the MAC address of a previously authenticated device. Once a device has been authenticated to the captive portal using valid credentials, the gateway adds that device's MAC address to its allowlist; since MAC addresses can easily be spoofed, any other device can pretend to be the authenticated device and bypass the captive portal. Once the IP and MAC addresses of other connecting computers are found to be authenticated, any machine can spoof the MAC address and Internet Protocol (IP) address of the authenticated target, and be allowed a route through the gateway. For this reason some captive portal solutions created extended authentication mechanisms to limit the risk for usurpation.

=== Require web browser ===
Captive portals often require the use of a web browser; users who first use an email client or other application that relies on the Internet may find the connection not working without explanation, and will then need to open a web browser to validate. This may be problematic for users who do not have any web browser installed on their operating system. It is however sometimes possible to use email and other facilities that do not rely on DNS (e.g. if the application specifies the connection IP address rather than the hostname). A similar problem can occur if the client uses AJAX or joins the network with pages already loaded into its web browser, causing undefined behavior (for example, corrupt messages appear) when such a page tries HTTP requests to its origin server.

Similarly, as HTTPS connections cannot be redirected (at least not without triggering security warnings), a web browser that only attempts to access secure websites before being authorized by the captive portal will see those attempts fail without explanation (the usual symptom is that the intended website appears to be down or inaccessible).

Platforms that have Wi-Fi and a TCP/IP stack but do not have a web browser that supports HTTPS cannot use many captive portals. Such platforms include the Nintendo DS running a game that uses Nintendo Wi-Fi Connection. Non-browser authentication is possible using WISPr, an XML-based authentication protocol for this purpose, or MAC-based authentication or authentications based on other protocols.

It is also possible for a platform vendor to enter into a service contract with the operator of a large number of captive portal hotspots to allow free or discounted access to the platform vendor's servers via the hotspot's walled garden. For example, in 2005 Nintendo and Wayport partnered to provide free Wi-Fi access to Nintendo DS users at certain McDonald's restaurants. Also, VoIP and SIP ports could be allowed to bypass the gateway to allow phones to make and receive calls.

== See also ==
- HTTP proxy
- Proximity marketing
- Mobile location analytics
