= WISPr =

Wireless networking protocol

WISPr (pronounced "whisper") or Wireless Internet Service Provider roaming is a draft protocol submitted to the Wi-Fi Alliance that allows users to roam between wireless internet service providers in a fashion similar to that which allows cellphone users to roam between carriers. A RADIUS server is used to authenticate the subscriber's credentials.

It covers best practices for authenticating users via 802.1X or the Universal Access Method (UAM), the latter being another name for browser-based login at a captive portal hotspot. It requires that RADIUS be used for AAA and defines the required RADIUS attributes. For authentication by smart-clients, Appendix D defines the Smart Client to Access Gateway Interface Protocol, which is an XML-based protocol for authentication. Smart-client software (and devices that use it) use this so-called WISPr XML to seamlessly login to HotSpots without the need for the user to interact with a captive portal.

The draft WISPr specification is no longer available from the Wi-Fi Alliance. It was submitted in a manner that does not conform with current IPR policies within the Wi-Fi Alliance.

Intel and others have started a similar proposal — IRAP, which has now been rolled into ETSI Telecoms & Internet converged Services & Protocols for Advanced Networks (TISPAN); TS 183 019 and TS 183 020.

The WISPr 2.0 specification was published by the Wireless Broadband Alliance in March 2010.

== See also ==
- IEEE 802.11
- Wireless Internet service provider
- ETSI
