= Open access (infrastructure) =

In the context of infrastructure, open access involves physical infrastructure such as railways and physical telecommunications network plants being made available to clients other than owners, for a fee.

For example, private railways within a steel works are private and not available to outsiders. In the hypothetical case of the steelworks having a port or a railway to a distant mine, outsiders might want access to save having to incur a possibly large cost of building their own facility.

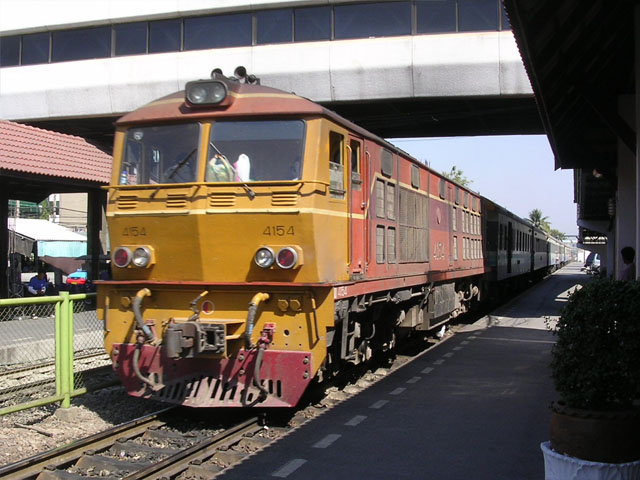
SRT Alsthom-built metre-gauge locomotive

== Marconi and radio communication ==
The Marconi Company was a pioneer of long distance radio communication, which was particularly useful for ships at sea. Marconi was very protective about its costly infrastructure and refused—except for emergencies—to allow other radio companies to share its infrastructure. Even if the message sender was royalty, as in the Deutschland incident of 1902, they continued to refuse access. Since radio communication was so new, it preceded laws, regulations and licenses, which might otherwise impose conditions to open infrastructure to other players.

== Pilbara railways ==
In the Pilbara region of Western Australia, two large mining companies operate their own private railway networks to bring iron ore from mines to the port. In 1999 North Limited made an application to access Rio Tinto's system, but Rio's takeover of North Limited meant that application was never fully tested. In 2004 Fortescue made an application to have the Mount Newman railway line owned by BHP Billiton declared for third party access. BHP claimed that it formed an integral part of the production process, and so should not be subject to completion requirements. When these mines started in the 1960s, state laws required the miners to make their infrastructure available to other players, but no application had been made. In the same region, the Fortescue railway line has been set up for open access for a fee.

In June 2008 the National Competition Council recommended that BHP Billiton's Goldsworthy railway line and Rio Tinto's Hamersley & Robe River railway line be declared open access. Treasurer Wayne Swan was given 60 days to make a final decision based on this recommendation. On October 27 the three lines were declared with open access to apply from November 20, 2008. This will apply for 20 years under the National Access Regime within the Trade Practices Act 1974. The declaration does not give a right of access, but provides a third party with recourse if access terms cannot be negotiated with the infrastructure owner.

== Concerns ==
A player seeking access to infrastructure would expect to pay several fees of a capital and operating kind. Hopefully, the cost of this is less than having to build separate infrastructure. It is in the public interest that access disputes be resolved in an efficient way, so that for example, profits are maximized and therefore income tax on those profits is also maximized.

The potential for monopoly infrastructure to charge high fees and provide poor service has long been recognized. Monopolies are often inevitable because of high capital costs, with governments often imposing conditions, in exchange for approval of the project and for the granting of useful powers such as land resumption. Thus a canal might have its rates regulated, and be forbidden to operate canal boats on its own waters.

== Trackage rights ==
Where there are many separate railways and one railway wishes to run trains off their own tracks onto the tracks of another, they may seek trackage rights from the other railway(s). This can be done by voluntary agreement, or by compulsory order of a regulator. In time of flood and accident which puts a line out of order, compulsory trackage rights may be ordered in the public interest to keep traffic flowing, assuming that alternative routes exist.

== Joint Venture ==
One of the problems faced by Open Access are fair prices. Consider the Iron Ore minnow BC Iron which seeks access to the Fortescue railway line. (Fortescue has declared itself to be an open access operator).

BC Iron and Fortescue agreed to set up a joint venture to operate both the BCI mine and the railway connection to the port. As the larger player, Fortescue will run the show. The joint venture gives BC Iron inside information as to how much the railway and port will cost, while Fortescue gains inside information about the mine.

== Geraldton ==
In 2010, Mount Gibson Iron spent a total of 20 million dollars to upgrade the ore unloaded at Geraldton. The facility will be open to other users who will pay a toll for such usage.

The Oakajee port and railway network is also to be open access.

== Queensland ==
In 2011, GVK has offered to make its proposed railway from the Galilee Basin to Abbot Point as open access to other players.

== Telecommunications ==
In the telecommunications industry, open access to existing infrastructure, in the form of local loop unbundling, duct sharing, utility pole sharing, and fiber unbundling, is one proposed solution to the middle mile problem.

== See also ==
- Network Rail
- Open access operator
