= Last mile (artificial intelligence) =

Metaphor in artificial intelligence

The last mile in the context of artificial intelligence (AI) and large language models (LLM) is a metaphor drawing on last mile (telecommunications) to refers to the limit or "gap" of what an AI model "knows" and human knowledge. Attending to the last mile gap is a strategy also to address algorithmic bias.

The last mile concept was used prior to the public rollout of ChatGPT in 2022, and gained traction in 2024 from multiple sources simultaneously. and amplified by Forbes Magazine. The "last mile" concept in AI entered common use in 2025 to refer to algorithm gaps, AI design gaps, and other gaps.

== See also ==
- Last mile (telecommunications)
