= Neighborhood Internet service provider =

A neighborhood Internet service provider (NISP) is a small scale broadband internet service provider targeted at a single subdivision or neighborhood. They are built in a neighborhood to provide Internet access to residents in the community, often using rooftop antennas in a hub-and-spoke arrangement to bridge the last few hundred feet to the residences (or possibly businesses). Such a network requires a local network engineer (often a volunteer) to maintain network integrity and monitor the quality of service.

There are firms that will install and maintain such a network, but there are other options. For instance, loosely knit communities across the world connect access points (which are owned by private citizens or local institutions) into wireless mesh networks, to set up wireless community networks targeted at the public.

== Advantages ==
With the right number of subscribers a NISP can easily cost less than the traditional DSL and cable lines. NISP offers greater speed in connectivity for larger groups of people compared to a Wi-Fi hotspot but at a cheaper price than wireless community network. NISP can use software such as P2P (peer-to-peer) in order to function efficiently with high performance neighbors. This can lead to the greatest amount of bandwidth being used by all. At the same time traffic can be kept within the network.

== Disadvantages ==
There are some legal disadvantages to having an NISP. For example, if the Internet connection being provided is secured by only one username and password, this makes the connection less secure since more than a few people have access. Another disadvantage is if a person has a stronger wi-fi transmitter they can use a particular frequency even if it causes the other neighbors connection to weaken.

== Alternate options ==
In smaller areas it can be beneficial to use Wi-Fi Hot Spots since it can provide more security, fewer legal repercussions, and cheaper and faster connectivity. For bigger groups it can be beneficial to use a wireless Internet service provider instead.

== See also ==
- Wireless Internet service provider
