= IP shuffling =

IP shuffling is the ability to set up a call path between two IP endpoints by rerouting the voice channel away from the usual TDM bus connection and creating a direct IP-to-IP connection. IP shuffling saves resources like TDM bus time slots and media channels and improve voice quality by eliminating unnecessary codec conversions. To enable IP shuffling there must be at least one common codec between the two point-to-point IP endpoints.

IP shuffling can take place not only inside of a system but also between multiple systems. This ability is particularly useful in a multi site call center environment where customer calls can be transferred from one person to another multiple times within the same transaction. IP shuffling will tear down each call leg and re-establish a point-to-point connection with the new calling party each time the call gets transferred, saving valuable system resources.

== IP Shuffling across systems ==
IP Shuffling between two call centers

IP shuffling is particularly useful in a multi call center environment. In this example, the customer establishes a call to a call center in Berlin, Germany.

1. The caller is placed in a music queue as no customer service consultant is available at this time. While the customer is queuing, a service consultant becomes available in the Cape Town, South African call center.
2. Should IP shuffling not be enabled, the call would be hair-pinning or tromboning through the Berlin call center to Cape Town, utilizing valuable Berlin media processing resources for the duration of the call.
3. With IP shuffling enabled the call leg between the customer and the Berlin call center is torn down and a direct connection to the IP agent sitting in Cape Town is established using IP shuffling.
