= Alvarion =

Israeli company

Alvarion Technologies Ltd.
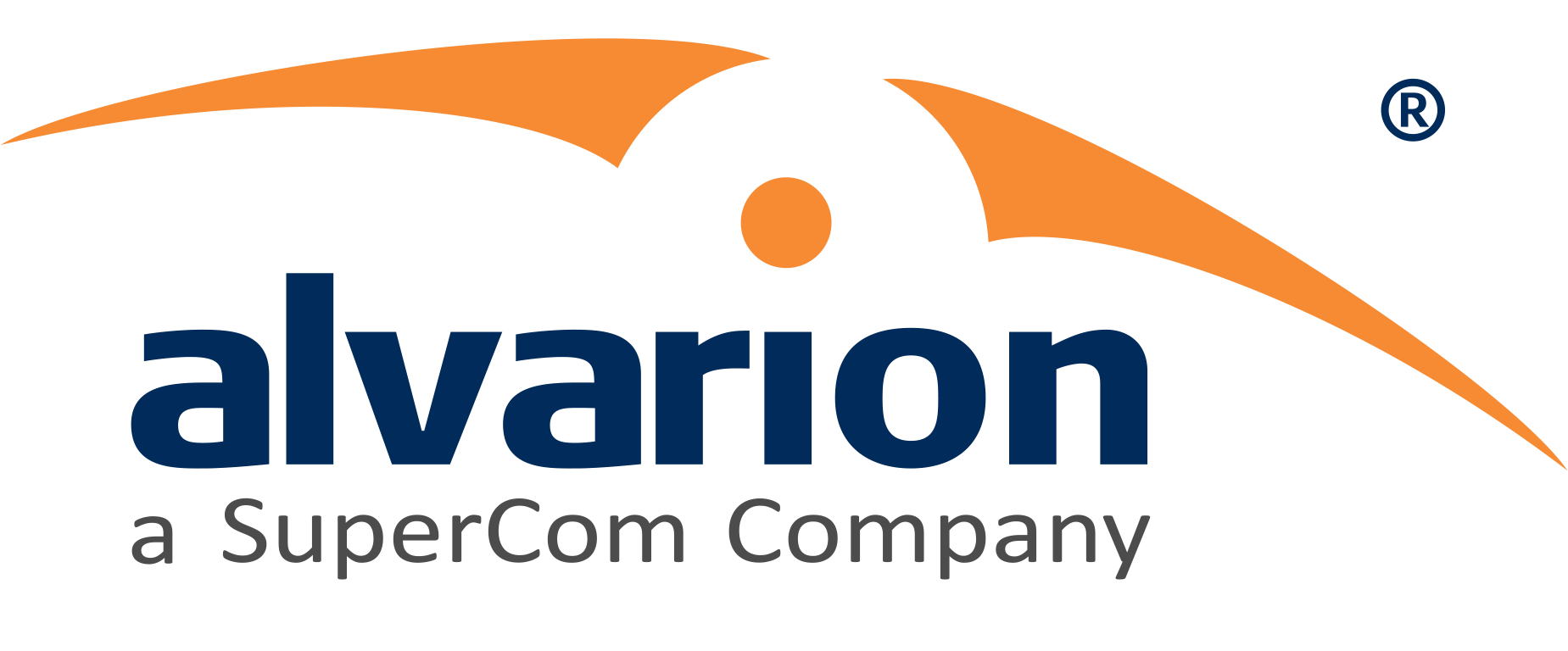
- Type: Subsidiary
- Traded as: Nasdaq: ALVR
- Industry: Electronics; Communications
- Founded: 1992; 34 years ago
- Headquarters: Herzliya, Israel
- Products: Wireless Communications; Broadband wireless; Wi-Fi
- Number of employees: 72
- Parent: SuperCom
- Website: www.supercom.com/alvarion

Alvarion Technologies Ltd. is a global provider of autonomous Wi-Fi networks designed with self-organizing capabilities for carrier-grade Wi-Fi, enterprise connectivity, smart city planning, smart hospitality, connected campuses, and connected events.

== History ==
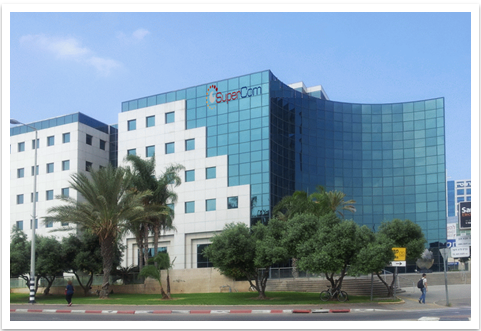
Alvarion building in Herzliya

Alvarion was originally incorporated as BreezeCOM Ltd. in September 1992 by Michael Rothenberg. In March 2000, BreezeCOM had an initial public offering, selling 5 million shares of its common stock at a price of $20 per share. BreezeCOM's shares were listed on the NASDAQ under the symbol BRZE.

In August 2001, BreezeCOM merged with another Israeli company, Floware Wireless Systems Ltd. (NASDAQ: FLRE), which was founded in 1993, changing its name to Alvarion.

In April 2003, Alvarion acquired InnoWave ECI Wireless Systems Ltd, from ECI Telecom.

In July 2003, Alvarion signed a strategic partnership agreement with Intel to co-develop WiMAX based Broadband wireless access systems, using Intel's WiMAX chips.

In December 2004, Alvarion acquired interWAVE Communications International (NASDAQ: IWAV) of Mountain View, California, which expanded the company's product range into the mobile GSM equipment market and provided new expertise in mobile systems. Most of the interWAVE operations became Alvarion's Cellular Mobile business unit, which was sold to LGC Wireless, Inc. in November 2006.

In February 2009, Alvarion announced that it was hired by Orange Botswana for WiMAX deployment, initially to cover Botswana’s two largest cities Gaborone and Francistown.

In November 2009, Alvarion started deploying a WiMAX wireless broadband network for the Australian ISP Adam Internet across metropolitan Adelaide, as a part of Australian government's Broadband Guarantee Program.

In November 2011, Alvarion acquired Wavion, a provider of outdoor Wi-Fi applications for metro and rural areas with deployments in more than 75 countries. This acquisition is part of Alvarion's strategic plan for shifting its primary focus from WiMAX-based radio access network to becoming a multi-technology wireless broadband solution provider.

In February 2013, Alvarion's BWA division (Carrier licensed) was acquired by Telrad Networks.

In July 2013, Alvarion filed for bankruptcy.

In September 2013 Alvarion was bought by Intechnology plc, owned by Peter Wilkinson, as a strategic investment. After the acquisition, Alvarion and Intechnology WiFi, together with the City of Edinburgh Council, announced the roll-out of an outdoor, free Wi-Fi service in Edinburgh city centre – providing residents and visitors access to fast internet connectivity.

In February 2015, Alvarion laid off a third of its work force due to a change of strategy.

in 2016 Alvarion was acquired by SuperCom, an electronic identity company that provides monitoring services for the e-Government, Public Safety, Health Care, and Finance sectors as part of its expansion into Secure IoT solutions.

== Products and technology ==
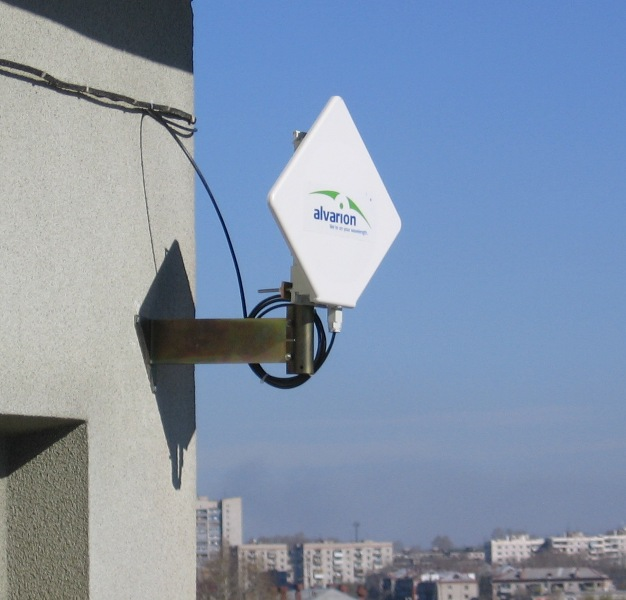
Alvarion WiMAX Customer-premises equipment

Alvarion Technologies provides Wi-Fi solutions for Smart Cities, mobile carriers, enterprises, smart hospitality, campuses, and High-Density Events. It was one of the first companies to produce IEEE 802.11 wireless LAN equipment and made some contributions to the development of the IEEE 802.11 standard. In collaboration with the Swedish Space Corporation and using its own BreezeNET DS.11 product, it also claims to hold a World record of the longest Wireless LAN link ever achieved – 310 kilometers (190 mi) from ground to a weather balloon (although it had been heavily amplified, used a huge dish antenna, and had an automatic tracking system). This record is not found in The Guinness Book of Records, however.

Alvarion is also active in the development of the IEEE 802.16x WiMAX standards and offers mobile WiMAX systems.

Following the acquisition of Wavion Wireless in 2011 Alvarion has been focused on delivering Wi-Fi-based platforms supporting the latest IEEE 802.11ac standard. The first Wi-Fi platform was WBS supporting IEEE 802.11g with the first beamforming technology. Alvarion developed a noise mitigation algorithm to provide continuous service in a noisy environment.

Following was the WBSn platform compliant with the IEEE 802.11n standard and holding the International Protection Marking of IP68, making it suitable for extreme outdoor conditions.

In 2016 Alvarion launched the WBSac series of products of indoor and outdoor access points compliant with IEEE 802.11ac and backwards-compatible with 802.11a/b/g/n.

== Commercial development ==
In November 2010, Alvarion was chosen by the telecommunication company 4G Africa to deploy 4G network in Cameroon. 4G Africa has the main goal to reduce digital divide by providing selected Sub-Sahara countries with the newly established 4G technology.

Wireless communications company ArrayComm announced the commercialized availability of base stations from Alvarion using ArrayComm's advanced beamforming software. ArrayComm officials said "using this technology, operators are able to see substantial improvement in system capacity, throughput, and range-yielding greater revenue from the investment in wireless infrastructure".

Alvarion announced it would supply base stations and related services to India cell phone carrier Bharat Sanchar Nigam for a 4G wireless broadband network. Alvarion president and CEO Eran Gorev said, "India has significant potential for wireless broadband, and this agreement further enhances our presence in the country." The project is worth an estimated $10 million.

Municipal officials in Houston selected Alvarion to deploy a citywide 4G network. According to city authorities, the network will improve traffic safety and congestion through remote control of 2500 traffic intersections and 1500 school zone flashers. Alvarion's WiMax network will also remotely monitor 500,000 water meters, reducing costs and improving customer service. The agreement includes free access to the 4G network for more than 300,000 residents in underserved, underprivileged communities.

In Oct 2010 Alvarion announced a 75 million dollar deployment in Canada working with Xplornet Communications deploying 4Motion base stations, NMS, and services to provide rural Broadband throughout the Country.

In May 2011, Alvarion launched 4G mobile networks in Mozambique and Uganda. The network will provide broadband connectivity to residential and business users as well as local municipalities. According to CEO Eran Gorev, Alvarion operates over 70 commercial 4G deployments in Africa.

In June 2011, Winncom Technologies, a distributor of wireless broadband networking equipment and accessories, announced that it has extended its distribution agreement with Alvarion to cover the Eastern European, Russian, and CIS regions.

In June 2011, Dimension Data Holdings announced a partnership with Alvarion. Nicholas Shaw, general manager of Dimension's Advanced Infrastructure, said Alvarion would bring connectivity to sites that fall outside of commercial networks or where fiber was not an option.

In July 2011, Bandera Electric Cooperative announced it would deploy a 4G network from Alvarion to linemen and technical service personnel operating utility trucks. The network will provide real-time information on the electric grid for BEC vehicles.

In August 2011, Bloosurf, a broadband service provider in Maryland, chose Alvarion to deploy 4G wireless networks to serve the county and university campuses.

In May 2012, a WiMAX network delivered by Alvarion to wireless broadband provider Skyline in Randers, Denmark, went bankrupt and was consequently closed down on June 30.

In 2015 Alvarion and InTechnology Wifi collaborated to provide Wi-Fi solutions in several UK festivals with high volume of people such as T in the Park and the British Summer Time festivals. During these festivals, Wi-Fi connection was provided to ten of thousands of people concurrently.

In 2015 Balton CP has deployed a high-speed Wi-Fi solution from Alvarion in more than 15 higher learning institutions throughout Rwanda.

In 2016 Alvarion signed a contract with one of the largest multi-national Mobile network operators (MNOs) to use Alvarion's products in order to enhance its existing wireless network and services.

Alvarion operates in Angola; Australia; Bermuda; Canada; Denmark; India; Israel; Nigeria; Spain; United Kingdom; United States; Zambia and in many more countries.
