= Airspan Networks =

American telecommunications company

Airspan Networks Inc.
- Type: Private Company
- Industry: Telecommunications equipment
- Founded: January 30, 1998; 28 years ago
- Headquarters: Boca Raton, Florida
- Key people: Glenn Laxdal, CEO & President; David Brant, CFO
- Number of employees: 800 (Dec 31, 2020)
- Website: www.airspan.com

Airspan Networks is an American telecommunications company, headquartered in Boca Raton, Florida. The company develops Radio Access Network technology including the Sprint 'Magic Box' and cells (both small and macro) for the Rakuten virtualized network.

Airspan was originally a product division of DSC Communications, a manufacturer of telephone switching equipment. Original products included a CDMA-based radio platform used for the fixed wireless market. In 1998, the company separated from DSC Communications and announced Eric Stonestrom as CEO and President.

Airspan originally focused its product line on the small cell and mini-macro equipment market, used by mobile operators to extend wireless services. Through the acquisition of Mimosa Networks in 2018, the company entered the market for fixed wireless solutions which are used in commercial, enterprise and operator networks for wireless backhaul and access applications.

Airspan's 5G NR development program is focused on mmWave, Sub 6 GHz, Massive MIMO, and Open Virtual RAN architectures. The company also offers fixed wireless access and backhaul solutions for PTP (point-to-point) and PTMP (point-to-multi-point) applications through its Mimosa Products.

In March, 2019, Airspan announced a partnership with Google in support of CBRS services.

In August 2021, Airspan completed a business combination with New Beginnings Acquisition Corp. The newly-renamed "Airspan Networks Holdings Inc. then began trading on the NYSE American under the ticker symbol MIMO.

== History ==
The company was founded in January 1998.

In May 1998, Eric D. Stonestrom was named president and chief executive officer of the company.

Its first product, AS4020 platform, was based on CDMA radio technology adapted for fixed wireless access points.

In July 2000, as the dot-com bubble was bursting, the company became a public company and raised $82.5 million in an initial public offering. Its stock price rose 113% in its first day of trading.

In 2004, the company made an agreement with Neda Telecommunications, a subsidiary of Aspen Wind Corporation, to send radios to Kabul, Afghanistan.

In the fourth quarter of 2005, the company released its WiMAX product line.

In September 2006, Oak Investment Partners made a $29 million investment in the company.

In 2010, the company teamed with LightSquared to market LightSquared's 1.4 GHz wireless spectrum in the United States. The spectrum is targeted primarily at the utility industry for Smart Grid deployments.

In 2009, the company's stock was delisted from the NASDAQ.

In March 2021, the company announced that it would be re-listed on NYSE American through a reverse merger with New Beginnings Acquisition Corporation, a special-purpose acquisition company.

In August 2021, the company completed the reverse merger with New Beginnings Acquisition Corporation. The parent company was hence renamed "Airspan Networks Holdings Inc." and began trading on the NYSE American under the ticker symbol MIMO.

In May 2023, Glenn Laxdal was announced as the new CEO.

In 2023 Airspan sold Mimosa to Indian communication giant JIO for $60 million through JIO wholly owned subsidiary Radisys Corporation.

In March 2024, the company announced that it would become private after receiving up to $95 million in new equity financing. The company's stock was soon delisted from the NYSE, and the company filed for a voluntary prepackaged Chapter 11 bankruptcy filing in order to implement the deal.

== Awards and recognition ==
Airspan's industry recognition and awards date back to 2007 when the company won the 'Best of WiMAX World USA Award'.

Airspan & Jio won the SCF 2020 Award for Excellence in Commercial Deployment (Urban).

Sprint and Airspan won the SCF 2019 Small Cell Award for Excellence in Commercial Deployment.

Sprint & Airspan Netlworks – Sprint LTE Magic Box won the SCF Award 2018 Excellence in Commercial Deployment (Residential).

Airspan and Sprint were selected as the winners for the “Best Mobile Technology Breakthrough” at GLOMO 2018 Awards.

Airspan and Qualcomm won the SCF 2021 Small Cell Award for Excellence in Commercial Deployment for 5G OpenRANGE mmWave outdoor small deployment.
