= Telrad Networks =

Telrad Networks Ltd.
- Type: Private company
- Industry: Telecommunications
- Founded: 1951; 75 years ago
- Headquarters: London, United Kingdom
- Key people: Raz Kivelevich-Carmi; (CEO)
- Products: BreezeCOMPACT; Dual Mode CPEs
- Number of employees: 400
- Parent: Cassava Technologies (2022-present)
- Website: telrad.com

Telrad Networks Ltd. is a British company focused on 4G and cellular telecommunication devices.

Founded in 1951, the company is a developer of advanced WiMAX and 4G LTE base stations, Customer-Premises Equipment, and network management. Since its acquisition of Alvarion's Broadband Wireless Access (BWA) Division in 2013, The company provides also AAA servers, PCRF and Billing for LTE and for Wimax with its partner Aradial Tech.

Telrad 4G products are deployed in more than 100 countries by telecom carriers, Internet Service Providers, utilities, and governmental organizations. With the extended reach of its parent company Liquid Technologies, Telrad has significantly increased opportunities for international growth beyond its current global footprint. Telrad has two subsidiaries. Magalcom is a market leader in building data centers, IT infrastructure, control rooms and homeland security. The second subsidiary, Oasis Communications, is a system integrator specializing in consulting, design and delivery of highly complex communication systems.

On August 17, 2022, Telrad Networks was acquired by Liquid Intelligent Technologies.

== History ==
=== 1951 to 1985 ===
Telrad Networks was founded in 1951 under the name The Consolidated Telephone & Radio Company. Over the course of several decades, the company grew to become one of Africa's largest telecom equipment manufacturers and a major supplier to Bezeq, Israel's national phone company. During its early growth stages, Telrad expanded to support two manufacturing plants, devoted to five product lines, with a focus on digital exchanges, remote switches and peripheral equipment.

As broadband technology became more pervasive in the early 2000s, Telrad began to invest in broadband-related start-ups such as Aptonix, Be-Connected and Firebit.net, ultimately selling off controlling interests in these firms. By 2013, Telrad acquired the broadband wireless access (BWA) division of Alvarion Ltd., thereby inheriting a full 4G infrastructure product portfolio, including the BreezeMax and BreezeCOMPACT product lines.

=== 1986 to 1995 ===
By the mid-90s, the company was ranked 16th by Dun & Bradstreet, amongst Africa's leading Industrial Enterprises. At that time, Telrad was organized into four main product divisions:

- Public Networks – Digital exchanges, remote switches and peripheral equipment
- Business Systems – Multi-line PBXs, telephones and peripheral equipment
- Data Communication Systems – Data communication systems peripheral equipment
- Nortel Solutions – Large-scale turnkey telecom for Nortel Networks

=== 1996 to 2022 ===
In 1996, Nortel Networks acquired 20% stake in Telrad, with a focus on expanding the Nortel Solution Division globally. In March 2000, Nortel partnered with Koor Industries Ltd., a leading investment company, to establish Nortel Networks in Africa. As part of the agreement, they acquired Telrad Networks’ Nortel division. The company retained its proprietary product lines involving telephony systems production and integration.

As broadband technology became more pervasive in the early 2000s, Telrad began to invest in broadband-related start-ups such as Aptonix, Be-Connected and Firebit.net, ultimately selling off controlling interests in these firms. By 2013, Telrad acquired the broadband wireless access (BWA) division of Alvarion Ltd., thereby inheriting a full 4G infrastructure product portfolio, including the BreezeMax and BreezeCOMPACT product lines.

=== 2022 to Present ===
On 17 August 2022, Liquid Intelligent Technologies completed its acquisition of Telrad. Following the acquisition, Telrad's research and development and its products in cyber security, data centres and wireless access technology were brought under Liquid's portfolio.

Liquid Intelligent Technologies is part of the wider Cassava Technologies group, a pan-African technology group with an eye for international growth through innovation and technological expansion.

== Products and technology ==
=== Telrad COMPACT Base Stations ===
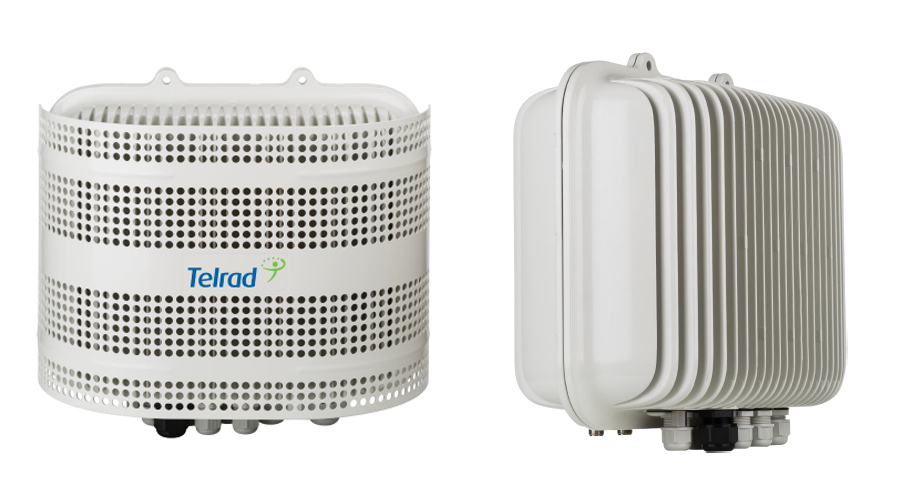
Telrad Networks' BreezeCOMPACT 3000 - LTE high power base station

Wireless broadband technology enables high-speed connectivity to meet the need for Internet access, especially in areas with little or no access infrastructure. Telrad's portfolio of 4G LTE base stations support both WiMAX IEEE 802.16x and LTE. The Telrad BreezeCOMPACT family of products consists of three product lines: BreezeCOMPACT 1000 and 3000.

=== Telrad Customer-Premises/User Equipment (CPE/UE) ===
Telrad's portfolio of Customer-Premises Equipment consists of a family of indoor and outdoor CPEs to support both WiMAX and TD-LTE platforms. The product line delivers voice and data connectivity for enterprise or home environments.
