= Mobile CDN =

A mobile content delivery network or mobile content distribution network (Mobile CDN) is a network of servers – systems, computers or devices – that cooperate transparently to optimize the delivery of content to end users on any type of wireless or mobile network. Like traditional CDNs, the primary purpose of a Mobile CDN is to serve content to end users with high availability and high performance. In addition, Mobile CDNs can be used to optimize content delivery for the unique characteristics of wireless networks and mobile devices, such as limited network capacity, or lower device resolution. Added intelligence around device detection, content adaptation can help address challenges inherent to mobile networks which have high latency, higher packet loss and huge variation in download capacity.

== Technology ==
Mobile CDNs should integrate mobile delivery services that optimize the delivery of any kind of content including live video streaming, on demand video and the delivery of other content assets. In the case of video content, these services include device detection, image rendering, video transcoding and bit-rate adaptation. For the optimization of the delivery of other content, mobile CDNs use technologies such as caching.

With currently available mobile CDN solutions, nodes are deployed at the edge of the network and in multiple locations, often over multiple backbones directly connected or peered with Mobile Network Operators (MNOs). These nodes cooperate with each other to satisfy requests for content by end users, transparently moving content to optimize the delivery process. The benefits of optimization can take the form of reduced bandwidth usage, improved end-user performance, or increased global availability of content over a mobile network.

Industry experts speculate whether mobile CDNs will take off due to technical and market issues. CDNs are important for mobile operators as they can lead to significant savings and avoid network congestion. However, a number of network-centric alternatives have been proposed including Fast Dormancy, increasing bandwidth capacity with upgrades to 4G/LTE, and offloading traffic to other networks such as Wi-Fi.

There is an increasing need to support mobile App performance beyond just mobile content delivery to the browser. For this reason, certain mobile CDNs, such as Neumob or Twin Prime, have moved beyond the browser and specialize in accelerating mobile apps. That is an important progression for a mobile CDN, as users are increasingly moving away from digesting content on desktops and are migrating to mobile device usage which is a combination of Mobile WEB and Mobile Apps. The challenge of consistent user experience across desktop, mobile device both mobile App and mobile WEB are critical.

== Commercial Mobile CDN's ==
- Neumob
- Twin Prime (purchased by Salesforce in December 2016)
- Instart Logic
