= Backhaul (telecommunications) =

Portion of a network between the backbone and the edge subnetworks

In a hierarchical telecommunications network, the backhaul portion of the network comprises the intermediate links between the core network, or backbone network, and the small subnetworks at the edge of the network (like for example private networks, LANs, etc.).

The most common network type in which backhaul is implemented is a mobile network. A backhaul of a mobile network, also referred to as a mobile-backhaul connects a cell site towards the core network. The two main methods of mobile backhaul implementations are fiber-based backhaul and wireless point-to-point backhaul. Other methods, such as copper-based wireline, satellite communications and point-to-multipoint wireless technologies are being phased out as capacity and latency requirements become higher in 4G and 5G networks.

In both the technical and commercial definitions, backhaul generally refers to the side of the network that communicates with the global Internet, paid for at wholesale commercial access rates to or at an Internet exchange point or other core network access location. Sometimes middle mile networks exist between the customer's own LAN and those exchanges. This can be a local WAN connection.

Cell phones communicating with a single cell tower constitute a local subnetwork; the connection between the cell tower and the rest of the world begins with a backhaul link to the core of the internet service provider's network (via a point of presence). A backhaul may include wired, fiber optic and wireless components. Wireless sections may include using microwave bands and mesh and edge network topologies that may use a high-capacity wireless channel to get packets to the microwave or fiber links.

== Definition ==
Visualizing the entire hierarchical network as a human skeleton, the core network would represent the spine, the backhaul links would be the limbs, the edge networks would be the hands and feet, and the individual links within those edge networks would be the fingers and toes.

Other examples include:

- Connecting wireless base stations to the corresponding base station controllers.
- Connecting DSLAMs to the nearest ATM or Ethernet aggregation node.
- Connecting a large company's site to a metro Ethernet network.
- Connecting a submarine communications cable system landing point (which is usually in a remote location) with the main terrestrial telecommunications network of the country that the cable serves.

== National broadband plans ==
A telephone company is very often the internet service provider providing backhaul, although for academic research and education networks, large commercial networks or municipal networks, it is increasingly common to connect to public broadband backhaul. See national broadband plans from around the world, many of which were motivated by the perceived need to break the monopoly of incumbent commercial providers. The US plan for instance, specifies that all community anchor institutions should be connected by gigabit fiber optics before the end of 2020.

== Available backhaul technologies ==
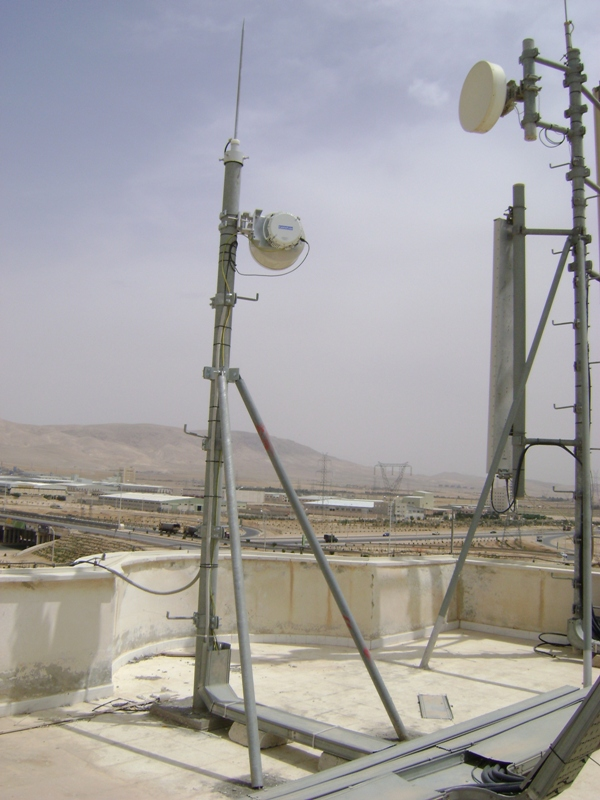
CableFree Microwave Backhaul links deployed for mobile operators in the Middle East. These microwave links typically carry a mix of Ethernet /IP, TDM (Nx E1) and SDH traffic to connect the Cellular Base Stations (BTS) to the central sites of the cellular operator. Such microwave links used to carry 2xE1 (4 Mbit/s) now carry 400 Mbit/s or more, using modern 1024QAM or higher modulation schemes.

The choice of backhaul technology must take account of such parameters as capacity, cost, reach, and the need for such resources as frequency spectrum, optical fiber, wiring, or rights of way.

Generally, backhaul solutions can largely be categorized into wired (leased lines or copper/fiber) or Wireless (point-to-point, point-to-multipoint over high-capacity radio links). Wired is usually a very expensive solution and often impossible to deploy in remote areas, hence making wireless a more suitable and/or a viable option. Multi-hop wireless architecture can overcome the hurdles of wired solutions to create efficient large coverage areas and with growing demand in emerging markets where often cost is a major factor in deciding technologies, a wireless backhaul solution is able to offer 'carrier-grade' services, whereas this is not easily feasible with wired backhaul connectivity.

Backhaul technologies include:

- Free-space optical (FSO)
- Point-to-point microwave radio relay transmission (terrestrial or, in some cases, by satellite)
- Point-to-multipoint microwave-access technologies, such as LMDS, Wi-Fi, WiMAX, etc., can also function for backhauling purposes
- DSL variants, such as ADSL, VDSL and SHDSL
- PDH and SDH/SONET interfaces, such as (fractional) E1/T1, E3, T3, STM-1/OC-3, etc.
- Ethernet
- VoIP telephony over dedicated and public IP networks

Backhaul capacity can also be leased from another network operator, in which case that other network operator generally selects the technology being used, though this can be limited to fewer technologies if the requirement is very specific such as short-term links for emergency/disaster relief or for public events, where cost and time would be major factors and would immediately rule out wired solutions, unless pre-existing infrastructure was readily accessible or available.

== Wireless vs. wireline backhaul ==
Wireless backhaul is easy to deploy, cost efficient and can provide high capacity connectivity, e.g., multiple gigabits per second, and even tens of Gbps. Wireline fiber backhaul, on the other hand, can provide practically endless capacity, but requires investment in deploying fiber as well as in optical equipment.

The above-mentioned tradeoff is considered when planning. The type of backhaul for each site is determined taking into consideration the capacity requirement (current and future), deployment timeline, fiber availability and feasibility and budget constraints.

== WiFi mesh networks for wireless backhaul ==
As data rates increase, the range of wireless network coverage is reduced, raising investment costs for building infrastructure with access points to cover service areas. Mesh networks are unique enablers that can reduce this cost due to their flexible architecture.

With mesh networking, access points are connected wirelessly and exchange data frames with each other to forward to/from a gateway point.

Since a mesh requires no costly cable constructions for its backhaul network, it reduces total investment cost. Mesh technology’s capabilities can boost extending coverage of service areas easily and flexibly.

For further cost reduction, a large-scale high-capacity mesh is desirable. For instance, Kyushu University's Mimo-Mesh Project, based in Fukuoka City, Fukuoka Prefecture, Japan, has developed and put into use new technology for building high capacity mesh infrastructure. A key component is called IPT, intermittent periodic transmit, a proprietary packet-forwarding scheme that is designed to reduce radio interference in the forwarding path of mesh networks. In 2010, hundreds of wireless LAN access points incorporating the technology were installed in the commercial shopping and entertainment complex, Canal City Hakata, resulting in the successful operation of one of the world's largest indoor wireless multi-hop backhauls. That network uses a wireless multi-hop relay of up to 11 access points while delivering high bandwidth to end users. Actual throughput is double that of standard mesh network systems using conventional packet forwarding. Latency, as in all multi-hop relays, suffers, but not to the degree that it compromises voice over IP communications.

== Open solutions: using many connections as a backhaul ==
Many common wireless mesh network hotspot solutions are supported in open source router firmware including DD-WRT, OpenWRT and derivatives. The IEEE 802.21 standard specifies basic capabilities for such systems including 802.11u unknown user authentication and 802.11s ad hoc wireless mesh networking support. Effectively these allow arbitrary wired net connections to be teamed or ganged into what appears to be a single backhaul – a "virtual private cloud". Proprietary networks from Meraki follow similar principles. The use of the term backhaul to describe this type of connectivity may be controversial technically. They invert the business definition, as it is the customer who is providing the connectivity to the open Internet while the vendor is providing authentication and management services.

== Very long range (including submarine) networks ==
On very large scale long range networks, including transcontinental, submarine telecommunications cables are used. Sometimes these are laid alongside HVDC cables on the same route. Several companies, including Prysmian, run both HVDC power cables and telecommunications cables as far as FTTx. This reflects the fact that telecommunications backhaul and long range high voltage electricity transmission have many technologies in common, and are almost identical in terms of route clearing, liability in outages, and other legal aspects.

== See also ==
- Access network
- Free Space Optics (FSO)
- Last mile
- Middle mile
- Optical fiber
- Point-to-multipoint
- Point-to-point
- Return channel
- Wireless LAN

== Bibliography ==
- Sauter, Martin (2009). Beyond 3G – Bringing Networks, Terminals and the Web Together: LTE, WiMAX, IMS, 4G Devices and the Mobile Web 2.0. Wiley. ISBN 978-0-470-75188-6.
- Hilt, Attila (2022). Throughput Estimation of K-zone Gbps Radio Links Operating in the E-band, Informacije MIDEM, Journal of Microelectronics, Electronic Components and Materials, Vol.52, No.1, pp.29-39, ISSN 2232-6979, Slovenia, 2022. DOI: 10.33180/InfMIDEM2022.104. (PDF)
