= Wireless broadband =

Telecommunications technology

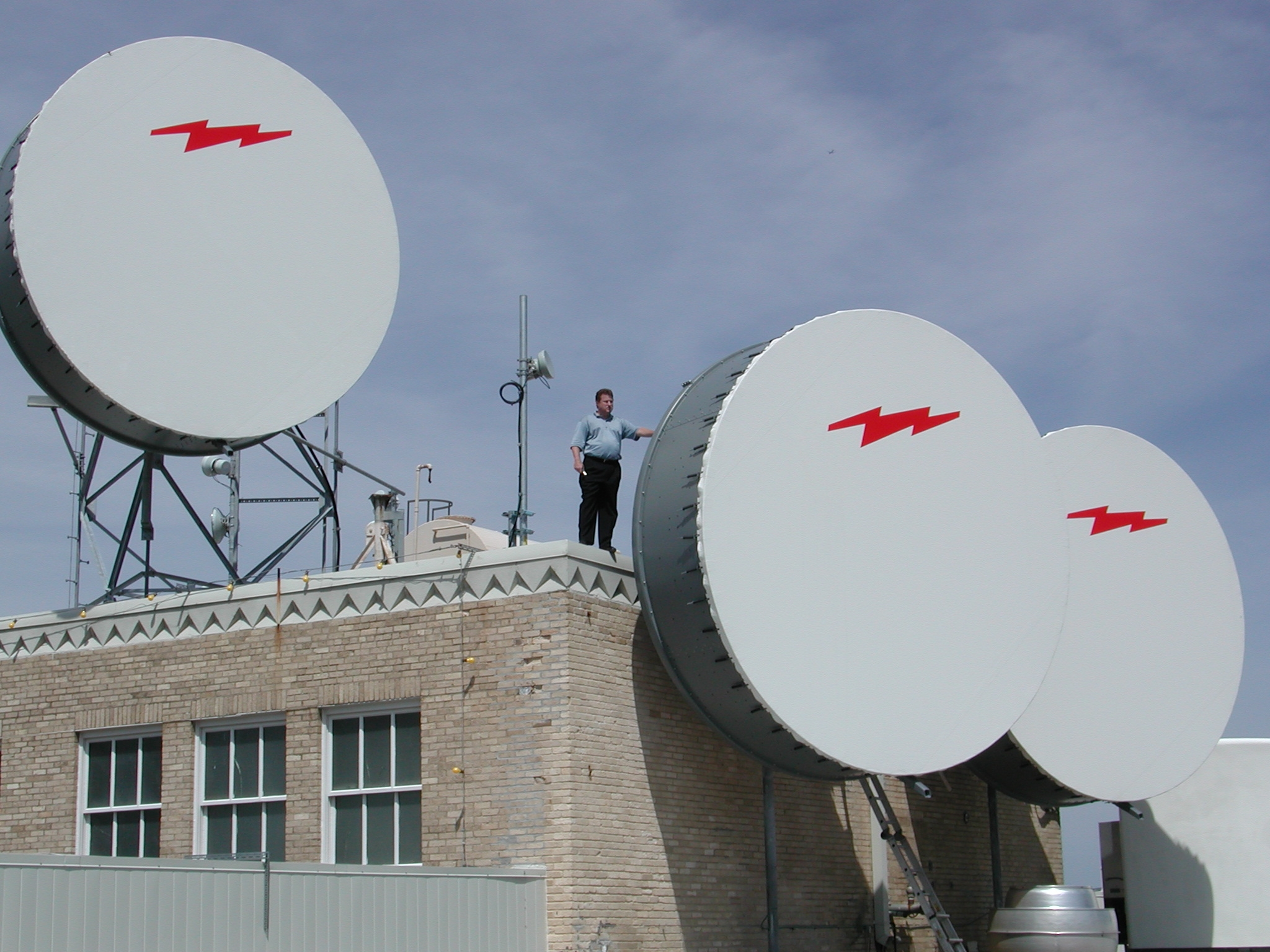
Three fixed wireless dishes with protective covers on top of 307 W. 7th Street, Fort Worth, Texas, around 2001

Wireless broadband is a telecommunications technology that provides high-speed Wireless Internet access or computer networking access over a wide area. The term encompasses both fixed and mobile broadband.

== The term broadband ==
Originally the word "broadband" had a technical meaning, but became a marketing term for any kind of relatively high-speed computer network or Internet access technology. According to the 802.16-2004 standard, broadband means "having instantaneous bandwidths greater than 1 MHz and supporting data rates greater than about 1.5 Mbit/s." The Federal Communications Commission (FCC) recently re-defined the word to mean download speeds of at least 25 Mbit/s and upload speeds of at least 3 Mbit/s.

== Technology and speeds ==
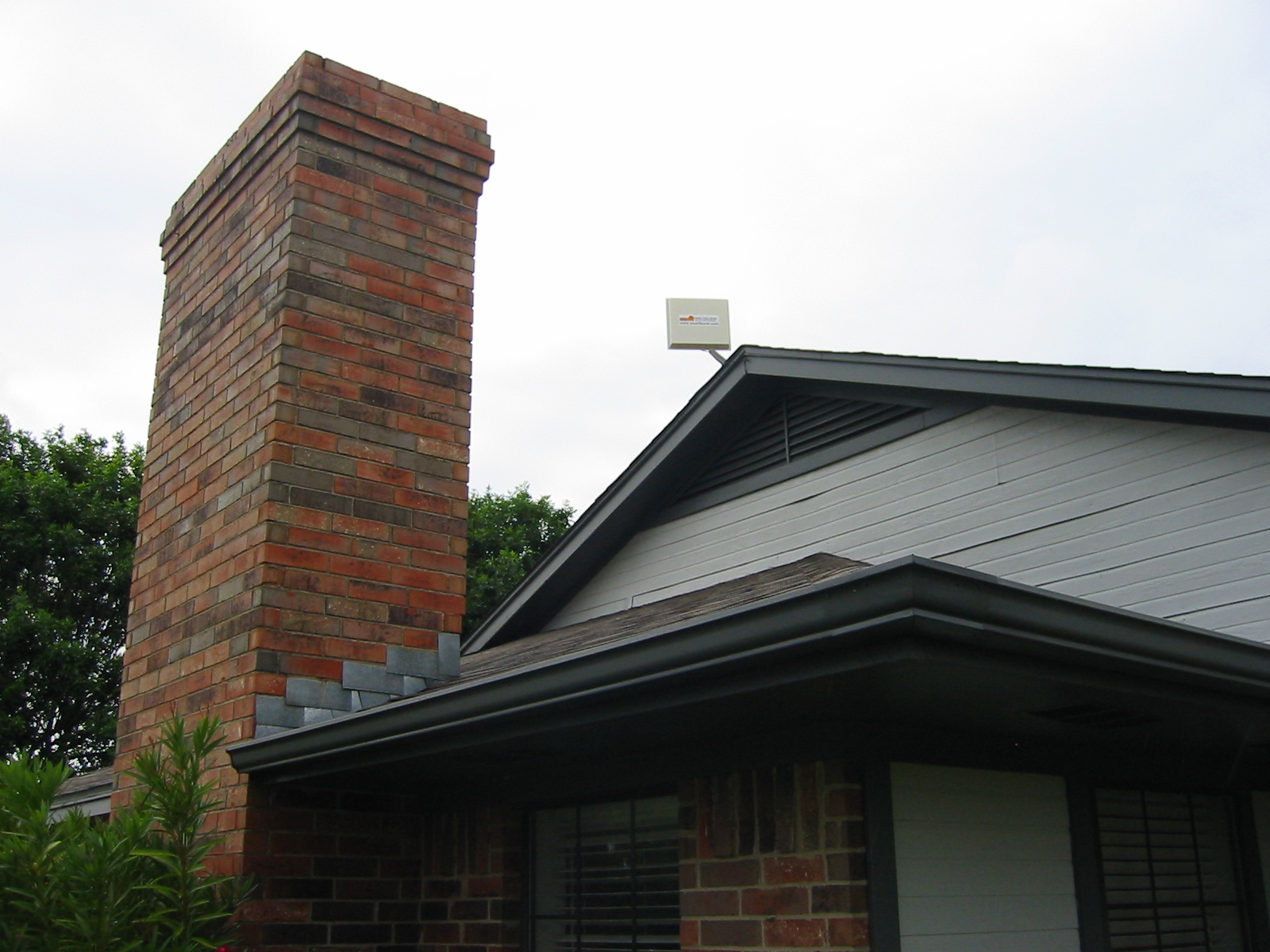
A typical WISP Customer Premises Equipment (CPE) installed on a residence

A wireless broadband network is an outdoor fixed and/or mobile wireless network providing point-to-multipoint or point-to-point terrestrial wireless links for broadband services.

Wireless networks can feature data rates exceeding 1 Gbit/s. Many fixed wireless networks are exclusively half-duplex (HDX), however, some licensed and unlicensed systems can also operate at full-duplex (FDX) allowing communication in both directions simultaneously.

Outdoor fixed wireless broadband networks commonly use a priority TDMA based protocol in order to divide communication into timeslots. This timeslot technique eliminates many of the issues common to 802.11 Wi-Fi protocol in outdoor networks such as the hidden node problem.

Few wireless Internet service providers (WISPs) provide download speeds of over 100 Mbit/s; most broadband wireless access (BWA) services are estimated to have a range of 50 km (31 mi) from a tower. Technologies used include Local Multipoint Distribution Service (LMDS) and Multichannel Multipoint Distribution Service (MMDS), as well as heavy use of the industrial, scientific and medical (ISM) radio bands and one particular access technology was standardized by IEEE 802.16, with products known as WiMAX.

WiMAX is highly popular in Europe but has not been fully accepted in the United States because cost of deployment. In 2005 the Federal Communications Commission adopted a Report and Order that revised the FCC's rules to open the 3650 MHz band for terrestrial wireless broadband operations.

Another system that is popular with cable internet service providers uses point-to-multipoint wireless links that extend the existing wired network using a transparent radio connection. This allows the same DOCSIS modems to be used for both wired and wireless customers.

== Development in the United States ==
On November 14, 2007, the Commission released Public Notice DA 07–4605 in which the Wireless Telecommunications Bureau announced the start date for licensing and registration process for the 3650–3700 MHz band. In 2010 the FCC adopted the TV White Space Rules (TVWS) and allowed some of the better no line of sight frequency (700 MHz) into the FCC Part-15 Rules. The Wireless Internet Service Providers Association, a national association of WISPs, petitioned the FCC and won.

Initially, WISPs were found only in rural areas not covered by cable or DSL. These early WISPs would employ a high-capacity T-carrier, such as a T1 or DS3 connection, and then broadcast the signal from a high elevation, such as at the top of a water tower. To receive this type of Internet connection, consumers mount a small dish to the roof of their home or office and point it to the transmitter. Line of sight is usually necessary for WISPs operating in the 2.4 and 5 GHz bands with 900 MHz offering better NLOS (non-line-of-sight) performance.

=== Residential Wireless Internet ===
Providers of fixed wireless broadband services typically provide equipment to customers and install a small antenna or dish somewhere on the roof. This equipment is usually deployed as a service and maintained by the company providing that service. Fixed wireless services have become particularly popular in many rural areas where cable, DSL or other typical home internet services are not available.

=== Business Wireless Internet ===
Many companies in the US and worldwide have started using wireless alternatives to incumbent and local providers for internet and voice service. These providers tend to offer competitive services and options in areas where there is a difficulty getting affordable Ethernet connections from terrestrial providers such as ATT, Comcast, Verizon and others. Also, companies looking for full diversity between carriers for critical uptime requirements may seek wireless alternatives to local options.

=== Demand for spectrum ===
To cope with increased demand for wireless broadband, increased spectrum would be needed. Studies began in 2009, and while some unused spectrum was available, it appeared broadcasters would have to give up at least some spectrum. This led to strong objections from the broadcasting community. In 2013, auctions were planned, and for now any action by broadcasters is voluntary.

== Mobile wireless broadband ==
In the United States, mobile broadband technologies include services from providers such as Verizon, AT&T Mobility, and T-Mobile which allow a more mobile version of Internet access. Consumers can purchase a PC card, laptop card, USB equipment, or mobile broadband modem, to connect their PC or laptop to the Internet via cell phone towers. This type of connection would be stable in almost any area that could also receive a strong cell phone connection. These connections can cost more for portable convenience as well as having speed limitations in all but urban environments.

On June 2, 2010, after months of discussion, AT&T became the first wireless Internet provider in the US to announce plans to charge according to usage. As the only iPhone service in the United States, AT&T experienced the problem of heavy Internet use more than other providers. About 3 percent of AT&T smart phone customers account for 40 percent of the technology's use. 98 percent of the company's customers use less than 2 gigabytes (4000 page views, 10,000 emails or 200 minutes of streaming video), the limit under the $25 monthly plan, and 65 percent use less than 200 megabytes, the limit for the $15 plan. For each gigabyte in excess of the limit, customers would be charged $10 a month starting June 7, 2010, though existing customers would not be required to change from the $30 a month unlimited service plan. The new plan would become a requirement for those upgrading to the new iPhone technology later in the summer.

== Licensing ==
A wireless connection can be either licensed or unlicensed. In the US, licensed connections use a private spectrum the user has secured rights to from the Federal Communications Commission (FCC). The unlicensed mobile wireless broadband, in US operates on CBRS which has three tiers. Tier 1 – Incumbent Access, reserved for US Federals Government, Tier 2 – Priority Access, a paid access with priority on the spectrum, Tier 3 – General Authorized Access (GAA), a shared spectrum. In other countries, spectrum is licensed from the country's national radio communications authority (such as the ACMA in Australia or Nigerian Communications Commission in Nigeria (NCC)). Licensing is usually expensive and often reserved for large companies who wish to guarantee private access to spectrum for use in point to point communication. Because of this, most wireless ISP's use unlicensed spectrum which is publicly shared.

== See also ==
- 802.20
- Connect card
- CorDECT
- HIPERMAN
- iBurst
- Policies promoting wireless broadband
