= Local multipoint distribution service =

Broadband wireless access technology

Local multipoint distribution service (LMDS) is a broadband wireless access technology originally designed for digital television transmission (DTV). It was conceived as a fixed wireless, point-to-multipoint technology for utilization in the last mile. LMDS commonly operates on microwave frequencies across the 26 GHz and 29 GHz bands. In the United States, frequencies from 31.0 through 31.3 GHz are also considered LMDS frequencies.

Throughput capacity and reliable distance of the link depends on common radio link constraints and the modulation method used – either phase-shift keying or amplitude modulation. Distance is typically limited to about 1.5 miles (2.4 km) due to rain fade attenuation constraints. Deployment links of up to 5 miles (8.0 km) from the base station are possible in some circumstances such as in point-to-point systems that can reach slightly farther distances due to increased antenna gain.

== History and outlook ==
=== United States ===
There was interest in LMDS in the late 1990s and it became known in some circles as "wireless cable" for its potential to compete with cable companies for provision of broadband television to the home. The Federal Communications Commission auctioned spectrum for LMDS in 1998 and 1999.

Despite its early potential and the hype that surrounded the technology, LMDS was slow to find commercial traction. Some equipment and technology vendors simply abandoned their LMDS product portfolios.

Industry observers believe that the window for LMDS has closed with newer technologies replacing it. Major telecommunications companies have been aggressive about deploying alternative technologies such as IPTV and fiber to the premises, also called "fiber optics". Moreover, LMDS has been surpassed in both technological and commercial potential by the LTE, WiMax and 5G NR standards.

=== Europe and worldwide ===
Although some operators use LMDS to provide access services, LMDS is more commonly used for high-capacity backhaul for interconnection of networks such as GSM, UMTS, LTE and Wi-Fi.

== See also ==
Multichannel multipoint distribution service
