= Middle mile =

Internet connection between "core" and local networks

In the broadband Internet industry, the "middle mile" is the segment of a telecommunications network linking a network operator's core network to the local network plant, typically situated in the incumbent telco's central office (British English: telephone exchange) that provides access to the local loop, or in the case of cable television operators, the local cable modem termination system. This includes both the backhaul network to the nearest aggregation point, and any other parts of the network needed to connect the aggregation point to the nearest point of presence on the operator's core network. The term middle mile arose to distinguish this part of the network from the last mile, which means the local links which provide service to the retail customer or end user, such as the local telephone lines from the telephone exchange or the coaxial cables from which connect to the customer's equipment.

Middle-mile provision is a major issue in reducing the price of broadband Internet provision by non-incumbent operators. Internet bandwidth is relatively inexpensive to purchase in bulk at the major Internet peering points, and access to end-customer ports in the incumbent operator's local distribution plant (typically where local loop unbundling is mandated by a telecom regulator) are also relatively inexpensive relative to typical broadband subscription costs.

However, middle-mile access, where bought from the incumbent operator, is often much more expensive than either, and typically forms the major expense of non-incumbent broadband ISPs. The alternative, building out their own fibre networks, is capital-intensive, and thus unavailable to most new operators. For this reason, many proposals for government broadband stimulus initiatives are directed at building out the middle mile. Two examples are the Network New Hampshire Now and Maine Fiber Company in the Northeast US, both funded largely by the National Broadband Plan (United States) to connect all community anchor institutions.

Open access initiatives such as duct sharing, utility pole sharing, and fiber unbundling are also being tried by regulators as mechanisms to ease the middle mile problem by reducing costs to non-incumbents. This sometimes leads to controversies, such as the NRECA opposition to pole attachment tariff changes motivated by the US plan.

Middle-mile, in logistics, coincides with its etymological meaning in the telecommunication network space. The "middle mile" refers to the stage before the last leg i.e., the "last mile" of any supply chain, wherein goods are hauled from a supplier's warehouse, shipper's production facility to a retail store.

== See also ==
- Forced access regulation
- Last mile
- Local loop unbundling
- Open access (infrastructure)
