= Point-to-multipoint communication =

Communications method involving a one-to-many connection

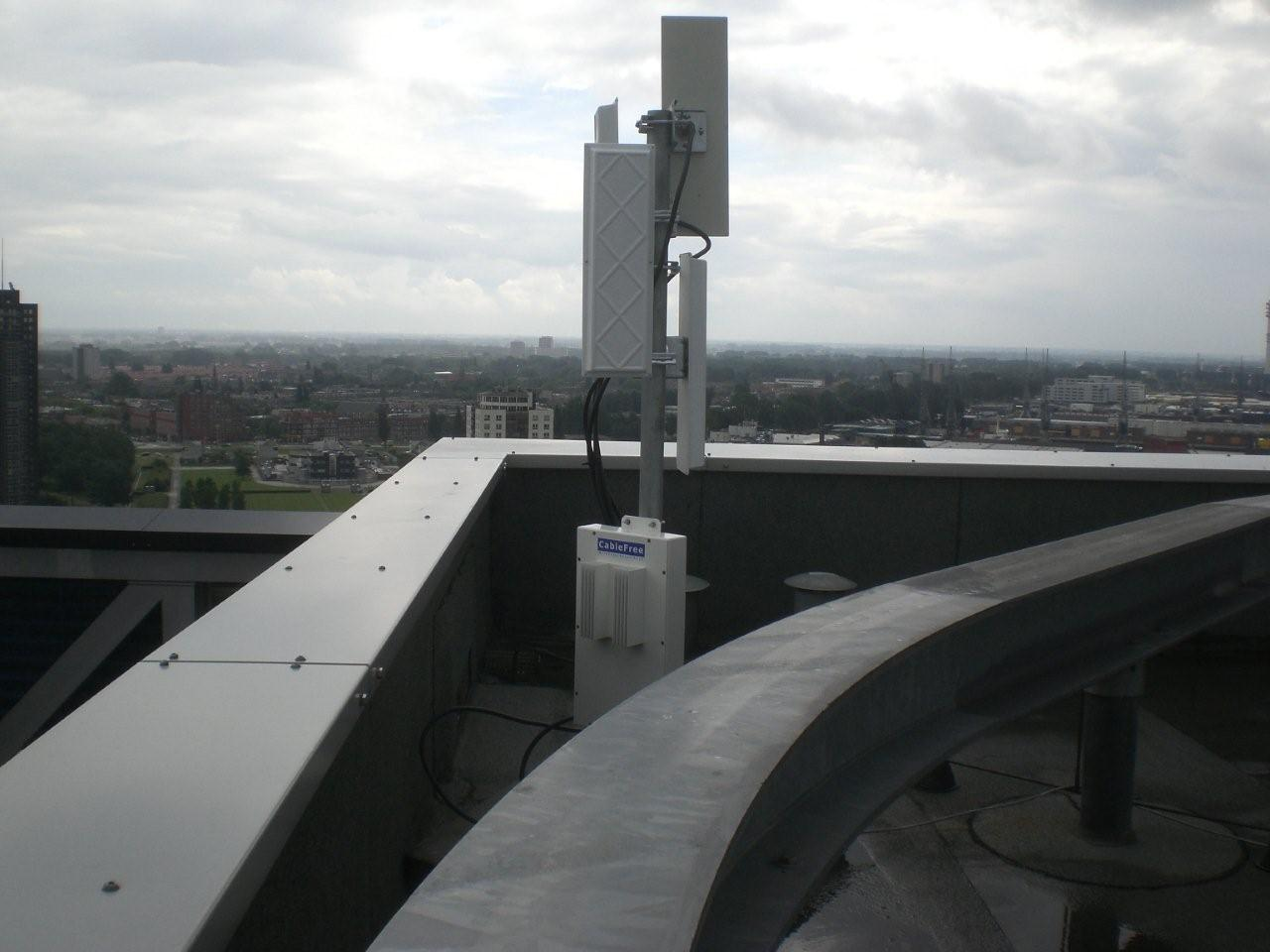
A point-to-multipoint radio base station manufactured by CableFree installed for a wireless internet service provider in Rotterdam. The station has four radio interfaces, each connected to a separate sector antenna, each providing 90 degrees coverage. Within 20 km of this base station, customer-premises equipment with high-gain directional antennas are installed on sites which can then connect to the base station to receive broadband data connections of typically 10–200 Mbit/s capacity.

In telecommunications, point-to-multipoint communication (P2MP, PTMP or PMP) is communication which is accomplished via a distinct type of one-to-many connection, providing multiple paths from a single location to multiple locations.

Point-to-multipoint telecommunications is typically used in wireless Internet and IP telephony via gigahertz radio frequencies. P2MP systems have been designed with and without a return channel from the multiple receivers. A central antenna or antenna array broadcasts to several receiving antennas and the system uses a form of time-division multiplexing to allow for the return channel traffic.

== Modern point-to-multipoint links ==
In contemporary usage, the term point-to-multipoint wireless communications relates to fixed wireless data communications for Internet or voice over IP via radio or microwave frequencies in the gigahertz range.

Point-to-multipoint is the most popular approach for wireless communications that have a large number of nodes, end destinations or end users. Point to Multipoint generally assumes there is a central base station to which remote subscriber units or customer premises equipment (CPE) (a term that was originally used in the wired telephone industry) are connected over the wireless medium. Connections between the base station and subscriber units can be either line-of-sight or, for lower-frequency radio systems, non-line-of-sight where link budgets permit. Generally, lower frequencies can offer non-line-of-sight connections. Various software planning tools can be used to determine feasibility of potential connections using topographic data as well as link budget simulation. Often the point to multipoint links are installed to reduce the cost of infrastructure and increase the number of CPE's and connectivity.

Point-to-multipoint wireless networks employing directional antennas are affected by the hidden node problem (also called hidden terminal) in case they employ a CSMA/CA medium access control protocol. The negative impact of the hidden node problem can be mitigated using a time-division multiple access (TDMA) based protocol or a polling protocol rather than the CSMA/CA protocol.

The telecommunications signal in a point-to-multipoint system is typically bi-directional, TDMA or channelized. Systems using frequency-division duplexing (FDD) offer full-duplex connections between base station and remote sites, and time-division duplex (TDD) systems offer half-duplex connections.

Point-to-multipoint systems can be implemented in licensed, semi-licensed or unlicensed frequency bands depending on the specific application. point-to-point and point-to-multipoint links are very popular in the wireless industry and when paired with other high-capacity wireless links or technologies such as free space optics (FSO) can be referred to as backhaul.

The base station may have a single omnidirectional antenna or multiple sector antennas, the latter of which allowing greater range and capacity.

== See also ==
- Broadcasting (networking)
- Local Multipoint Distribution Service
- Multichannel Multipoint Distribution Service
- Wireless access point
- Multiprotocol Label Switching
