= Microwave Bypass =

Microwave Bypass logo

Microwave Bypass, Inc. launched the world's first fixed wireless internet access technology in 1987, a decade before Wi-Fi. It enabled local and remote networks to connect at the then full Ethernet (802.3) data rate of 10 megabits per second, and for up to 4.3 miles.

The company was founded in March 1986 by David Theodore (25), operating from One Kendall Square, Cambridge, Massachusetts. Its wireless solution consisted of a modified broadcast quality video radio (23 GHz) coupled with Microwave Bypass' EtherWave Transceiver. The system met the then highest Ethernet throughput and could transmit 4.3 miles (6.9 km), in keeping with Ethernet's propagation delay allowance (46.4 μs).

Beta testing occurred at Massachusetts General Hospital in March 1987, at the invitation of network manager, David Murphy, and with Network World's Laura DiDio and representatives of Harvard University and Boston University's Dr. Mikhail Orlov in attendance. After a successful demo the first two production links were installed in parallel between Massachusetts General Hospital in Boston and Harvard's Cardiac Computer Center, 2.5 miles (4.0 km) across the Charles River. This also marked the first wireless transmission of MR images.

In 1988, Microwave Bypass collaborated with Cisco Systems on a full-duplex EtherWave Transceiver to eliminate 802.3 collision detection and permit longer distance connections as far as the microwave could reach. This first full-duplex design was developed for an application at MIT, between its main campus and Lincoln Laboratories. Later that year Microwave Bypass completed an exclusive deal, announced by Motorola, for the transfer of its EtherWave Transceiver and LAN-LINK 1000 Bridge technologies.
