= Point-to-point (telecommunications) =

Communication connection between two nodes or endpoints

In telecommunications, a point-to-point connection is a communications connection between two communication endpoints or nodes. An example is a telephone call, in which one telephone is connected with one other, and what is said by one caller can only be heard by the other. This is contrasted with a point-to-multipoint or broadcast connection, in which many nodes can receive information transmitted by one node. Other examples of point-to-point communications links are leased lines and microwave radio relay.

The term is also used in computer networking and computer architecture to refer to a wire or other connection that links only two computers or circuits, as opposed to other network topologies such as buses or crossbar switches which can connect many communications devices.

Point-to-point is sometimes abbreviated as P2P. This usage of P2P is distinct from P2P meaning peer-to-peer in the context of file sharing networks or other data-sharing protocols between peers.

== Basic data link ==
A traditional point-to-point data link is a communications medium with exactly two endpoints and no data or packet formatting. The host computers at either end take full responsibility for formatting the data transmitted between them. The connection between the computer and the communications medium was generally implemented through an RS-232 or similar interface. Computers in close proximity may be connected by wires directly between their interface cards.

When connected at a distance, each endpoint would be fitted with a modem to convert analog telecommunications signals into a digital data stream. When the connection uses a telecommunications provider, the connection is called a dedicated, leased, or private line. The ARPANET used leased lines to provide point-to-point data links between its packet-switching nodes, which were called Interface Message Processors.

== Modern links ==
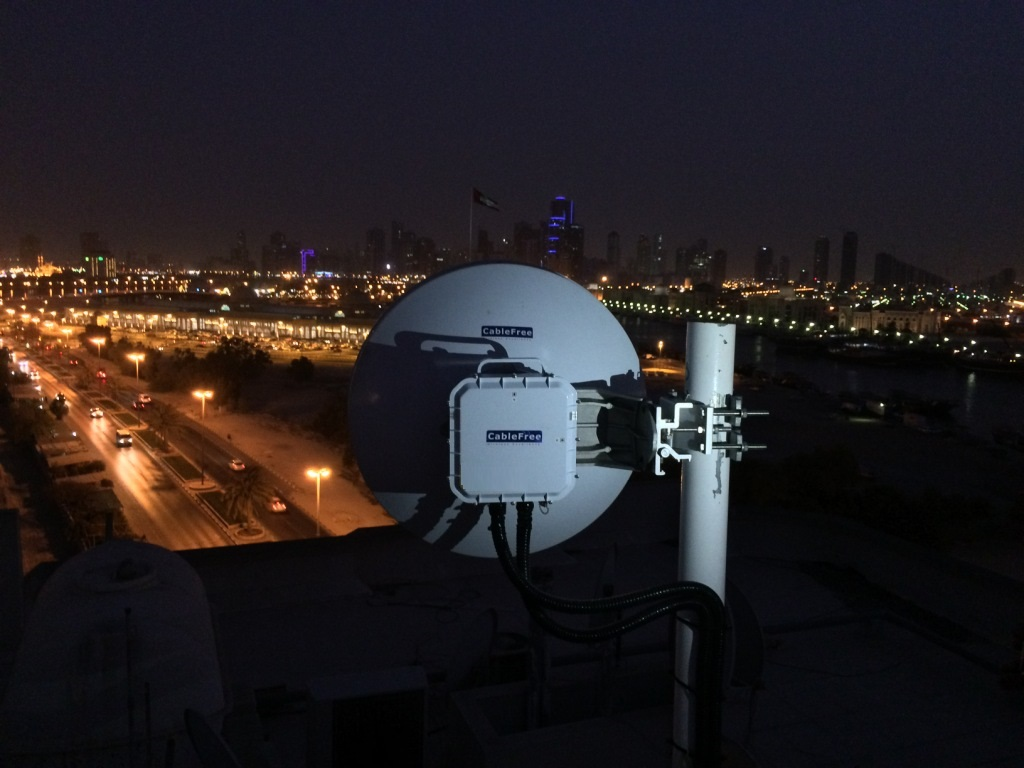
A 1 Gbit/s point-to-point millimeter-wave link installed in the UAE

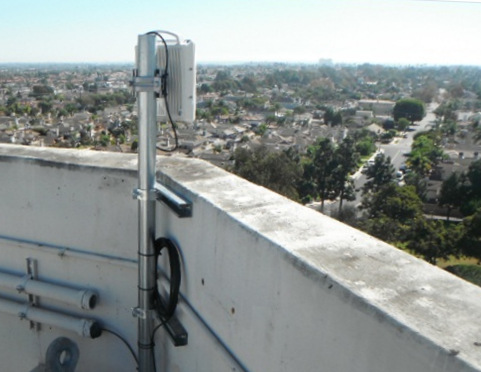
A point-to-point wireless unit with a built-in antenna at Huntington Beach, California

With the exception of passive optical networks, modern Ethernet is exclusively point-to-point on the physical layer – any cable only connects two devices. The term point-to-point telecommunications can also mean a wireless data link between two fixed points. The wireless communication is typically bi-directional and either time-division multiple access (TDMA) or channelized. This can be a microwave relay link consisting of a transmitter which transmits a narrow beam of microwaves with a parabolic dish antenna to a second parabolic dish at the receiver. It also includes technologies such as lasers which transmit data modulated on a light beam. These technologies require an unobstructed line of sight between the two points and thus are limited by the visual horizon to distances of about 40 miles (64 km). (Note: The Telecommunications Industry Association's engineering committees develop U.S. standards for point-to-point communications and related cellular tower structures. Online tools help users find if they have such line of sight.)

== Networking ==
In a local network, repeater hubs or switches provide basic connectivity. A hub provides a point-to-multipoint (or simply multipoint) circuit in which all connected client nodes share the network bandwidth. A switch on the other hand provides a series of point-to-point circuits, via microsegmentation, which allows each client node to have a dedicated circuit and the added advantage of having full-duplex connections.

From the OSI model's layer perspective, both switches and repeater hubs provide point-to-point connections on the physical layer. However, on the data link layer, a repeater hub provides point-to-multipoint connectivity – each frame is forwarded to all nodes – while a switch provides virtual point-to-point connections – each unicast frame is only forwarded to the destination node.

Within many switched telecommunications systems, it is possible to establish a permanent circuit. One example might be a telephone in the lobby of a public building, which is programmed to ring only the number of a telephone dispatcher. "Nailing down" a switched connection saves the cost of running a physical circuit between the two points. The resources in such a connection can be released when no longer needed, for example, a television circuit from a parade route back to the studio.

== See also ==
- IP shuffling
- Point-to-multipoint communication
