= UNII =

UNII may refer to:

- Unlicensed National Information Infrastructure (U-NII)
- Unique Ingredient Identifier
