= Holding time =

Holding time may refer to:

- Holding (aviation), used to delay aircraft already in flight
- Holding time (attachment therapy), where a child is laid upon to produce a cathartic response
- Call duration

== See also ==
- Hold time (disambiguation)
