= AFC =

AFC or AfC may refer to:

== Organizations ==
- Action for Children, a UK children's charity
- AFC Enterprises, the franchisor of Popeyes Chicken and Biscuits
- Africa Finance Corporation, a pan-African multilateral development finance institution
- Agenda for Change, the current NHS pay grade system
- Alabama Forestry Commission
- Alliance of Forces of Freedom and Change, a 2019 Sudanese alliance of coalitions of political and rebel groups
- America First Committee, historical US non-interventionist group
- Army Foundation College, British future soldier training organization
- Association Française des directeurs de la photographie Cinématographique, the French Society of Cinematographers
- Australian Film Commission, Australian government's film industry promotion commission 1975–2008
- Australian Flying Corps, the forerunner of the Royal Australian Air Force
- U.S. Army Futures Command

== Sports ==
=== Football ===
==== United Kingdom ====
- Aberdeen F.C., a professional association football club based in Aberdeen, Scotland
- Airdrieonians F.C., a professional association football club based in Airdrie, Scotland
- Altrincham F.C., a professional association football club based in Altrincham, England
- Ambassadors F.C., an association football club based in Northern Ireland
- Annalong F.C., an association football club based in Northern Ireland
- Aquinas F.C., an intermediate association football club based in Northern Ireland
- Ards F.C., a semi-professional association football club based in Newtownards, Northern Ireland
- Ardstraw F.C., an association football club based in Northern Ireland
- Arsenal F.C., a professional association football club based in North London, England

==== Elsewhere ====
- Adelaide Football Club, a professional Australian rules football club based in Adelaide, South Australia
- Agila F.C., a professional association football club from the Philippines
- Aizawl FC, a professional association football club based in Aizawl, Mizoram, India
- Altitude FC (Canada), a semi-professional soccer club based in North Vancouver, British Columbia, Canada
- Amarante F.C., a professional association football club based in Amarante, Portugal
- American Football Conference, one of the two conferences of the National Football League, US
- América Football Club (disambiguation), various association football clubs under this name
- AFC Ajax, a professional association football club based in Amsterdam, Netherlands
- Amsterdamsche FC, a semi-professional association football club based in Amsterdam, Netherlands
- Asian Football Confederation, the governing body of association football in Asia

=== Martial arts ===
- Aggression Fighting Championship, formerly Aggression MMA and Armageddon Fighting Championship a Canadian mixed martial arts promotion
- Australian Fighting Championship, a professional mixed martial arts promotion

== Technology ==
- AFC Energy, a developer of fuel cell technology
- Alkaline fuel cell, a type of fuel cell
- Application Foundation Classes, a graphical framework for building Java-based graphical user interfaces (GUIs), developed by Microsoft
- Automated fare collection systems for public transport
- Automatic frequency control
- Automated Frequency Coordination, a system for coordinating Wi-Fi channels using an online database
- Abstraction–filtration–comparison test, a legal test to about the copyrightability of computer programs

== Other uses ==
- Air Force Cross (United Kingdom), a British military decoration
- Air Force Cross (United States), an American military decoration
- Antral follicle count, ovarian health statistic
- Atlanta Financial Center, an office building complex in Buckhead, Atlanta, Georgia, US
- Average fixed cost, economic term

== See also ==
- AAFC (disambiguation)
