= 6G Wi-Fi =

6G Wi-Fi may refer to:

- Wi-Fi 6, the sixth generation of Wi-Fi technology
- 6 GHz Wi-Fi
