= 5G Wi-Fi =

5G Wi-Fi may refer to:

- IEEE 802.11ac-2013, the fifth generation of Wi-Fi technology
- 5 GHz Wi-Fi
