= Power control =

Automatic control of transmission power in mobile phones

Power control, broadly speaking, is the intelligent selection of transmitter power output in a communication system to achieve good performance within the system. The notion of "good performance" can depend on context and may include optimizing metrics such as link data rate, network capacity, outage probability, geographic coverage and range, and life of the network and network devices. Power control algorithms are used in many contexts, including cellular networks, sensor networks, wireless LANs, and DSL modems.

== Transmit power control ==
Transmit power control is a technical mechanism used within some networking devices in order to prevent too much unwanted interference between different wireless networks (e.g. the owner's network and the neighbour's network). It is also essential component in case of cognitive radio networks deployed in a distributed fashion, a.k.a. distributed power control.

The network devices supporting this feature include IEEE 802.11h Wireless LAN devices in the 5 GHz band compliant to the IEEE 802.11a. The idea of the mechanism is to automatically reduce the used transmission output power when other networks are within range. Reduced power means reduced interference problems and increased battery life. The power level of a single device can be reduced by 6 dB, which should result in an accumulated power level reduction (the sum of radiated power of all devices currently transmitting) of at least 3 dB (half of the power).

== UMTS ==
Because of the interference in the WCDMA system, power control plays a very important role in the quality control for the different services in the UMTS system. Power control is executed 1500 times per second, whereas in the GSM system it is ~2 times per second.

== See also ==
- Cellular network
- Cellular traffic
- IEEE 802.11h
- Radio resource management
- Spectral efficiency
- Wireless LAN
