= Automated Frequency Coordination =

System for coordinating Wi-Fi channels

Automated Frequency Coordination (AFC) is a channel allocation scheme specified for wireless LANs, commonly known as Wi-Fi. It is used when allocating frequencies for use in the 6 GHz frequency band, and was introduced with Wi-Fi 6E and Wi-Fi 7, which were the first Wi-Fi standards to make use of the band. Devices that are obligated to use AFC request authorization to use a given channel by determining their own precise geographical location using satellite positioning, and communicating with an online database in order to avoid conflicts with registered users of the band, such as microwave links used in fixed-satellite services. AFC is not required for Wi-Fi radios broadcasting indoors at lower power, and support for AFC is optional in devices using the 6 GHz Wi-Fi frequency band seeking to be Wi-Fi Certified.

In countries where AFC authorization is required before broadcasting 6 GHz Wi-Fi at higher power levels, such as the United States and Canada, devices that wish to do so must communicate with companies known as AFC providers, which manage a database of registered 6 GHz broadcasters, including their locations, power levels, and antenna coverage. The provider cross-references the device's location and its own database to supply a list of available channels and maximum transmission power levels back to the device, and the device must check back periodically. The provider has no role in preventing interference between the clients themselves.

The FCC in the United States and the ISED in Canada have each defined a Standard Power (SP) class for radios operating indoors and outdoors, which must coordinate channel use through AFC. Devices broadcasting at Standard Power are allowed to operate at a maximum transmit power (effective isotropic radiated power or EIRP) of 36 dBm and a maximum spectral density of 23 dBm per MHz. The FCC and ISED also define a Low Power Indoor class (LPI) which permits devices to use the entire 6 GHz frequency band (5955–7115 MHz) at a maximum EIRP of 30 dBm and a maximum spectral density of 5 dBm per MHz. Use of the LPI class is only permitted indoors. In the United States, devices using the 6 GHz band that do not support AFC are not allowed to be weather-resistant, run on battery power, or be connected to external antennas.

Devices using AFC must be able to determine their own precise location through a global navigation satellite system (GNSS) such as GPS, and devices that lack built-in GNSS capability may require an additional hardware module. In countries requiring AFC, the Standard Power class cannot be used in locations without AFC coverage. Devices must request authorization from an AFC provider every 24 hours, with an additional 24-hour grace period in case of disconnection, during which the device must reacquire authorization. Otherwise the device must cease operation or degrade to LPI.

== See also ==
- Dynamic frequency selection – allocation scheme with similar aims, standardized in 2003
- List of WLAN channels § 6 GHz (802.11ax/be/bn) – table of 6 GHz Wi-Fi channels by channel width, with device classes
