= AAFC =

AAFC may refer to:

== Sport ==
- Alexandra Athletic F.C., a defunct Scottish association football club
- All-America Football Conference, a professional American football league that challenged the established National Football League from 1946 to 1949
- Alloa Athletic F.C., a Scottish association football club
- Annan Athletic F.C., a Scottish association football club
- Ardwick Association Football Club, former name of Manchester City F.C., an English association football club
- Arlesey Athletic F.C., an English non-league association football club
- Ashington A.F.C., an English non-league association football club
- Ashton Athletic F.C., an English non-league association football club
- Australian Amateur Football Council, the governing body for the sport of amateur Australian rules football in the states of Victoria, South Australia and Tasmania

== Other uses ==
- Australian Air Force Cadets, an Australian youth organisation supported by the RAAF
- Agriculture and Agri-Food Canada, a federal agency of Canada

== See also ==
- AFC (disambiguation)
