= Channel allocation schemes =

In radio resource management for wireless and cellular networks, channel allocation schemes allocate bandwidth and communication channels to base stations, access points and terminal equipment. The objective is to achieve maximum system spectral efficiency in bit/s/Hz/site by means of frequency reuse, but still assure a certain grade of service by avoiding co-channel interference and adjacent channel interference among nearby cells or networks that share the bandwidth.

Channel-allocation schemes follow one of two types of strategy:

1. Fixed: FCA, fixed channel allocation: manually assigned by the network operator
2. Dynamic:
  1. DCA, dynamic channel allocation
  2. DFS, dynamic frequency selection
  3. Spread spectrum

== Static Channel Allocation ==
In Fixed Channel Allocation or Fixed Channel Assignment (FCA) each cell is given a predetermined set of frequency channels. FCA requires manual frequency planning, which is an arduous task in time-division multiple access (TDMA) and frequency-division multiple access (FDMA) based systems since such systems are highly sensitive to co-channel interference from nearby cells that are reusing the same channel. Another drawback with TDMA and FDMA systems with FCA is that the number of channels in the cell remains constant irrespective of the number of customers in that cell. This results in traffic congestion and some calls being lost when traffic gets heavy in some cells, and idle capacity in other cells.

If FCA is combined with conventional FDMA and perhaps or TDMA, a fixed number of voice channels can be transferred over the cell. A new call can only be connected by an unused channel. If all the channel are occupied than the new call is blocked in this system. There are however several dynamic radio-resource management schemes that can be combined with FCA. A simple form is traffic-adaptive handover threshold, implying that calls from cell phones situated in the overlap between two adjacent cells can be forced to make the handover to the cell with the lowest load for the moment. If FCA is combined with spread spectrum, the maximum number of channels is not fixed in theory, but in practice a maximum limit is applied, since too many calls would cause too high co-channel interference level, causing the quality to be problematic. Spread spectrum allows cell breathing to be applied, by allowing an overloaded cell to borrow capacity (maximum number of simultaneous calls in the cell) from a nearby cell that is sharing the same frequency.

FCA can be extended into a DCA system by using a borrowing strategy in which a cell can borrow channels from the neighboring cell which is supervised by Mobile Switching Center (MSC).

== Dynamic Frequency Selection ==
Dynamic Frequency Selection (DFS) is a mechanism specified for wireless networks with non-centrally controlled access points, such as wireless LAN (commonly Wi-Fi). It is designed to prevent interference with other usages of the frequency band, such as military radar, satellite communication, and weather radar. The access points would automatically select frequency channels with low interference levels. In case of wireless LAN standard, DFS was standardized in 2003 as part of IEEE 802.11h. Actual frequency band for DFS vary by jurisdiction. It is often enforced for the frequency bands used by Terminal Doppler Weather Radar and C-Band satellite communication. The misconfiguration of DFS had caused significant disruption in weather radar operation during early deployments of 5 GHz Wi-Fi in a number of countries in the world. For example, DFS is also mandated in the 5470-5725 MHz U-NII band for radar avoidance in United States.

== Dynamic Channel Allocation ==
A more efficient way of channel allocation would be Dynamic Channel Allocation or Dynamic Channel Assignment (DCA) in which voice channel are not allocated to cell permanently, instead for every call request base station request channel from MSC. The channel is allocated following an algorithm which accounts the following criteria:

- Future blocking probability in neighboring cells and Reuse distance
- Usage frequency of the candidate channel
- Average blocking probability of the overall system
- Instantaneous channel occupancy distribution

It requires the MSC to collect real time data on channel occupancy, traffic distribution and Received Signal Strength Indications (RSSI). DCA schemes are suggested for TDMA/FDMA based cellular systems such as GSM, but are currently not used in any products. OFDMA systems, such as the downlink of 4G cellular systems, can be considered as carrying out DCA for each individual sub-carrier as well as each timeslot.

DCA can be further classified into centralized and distributed. Some of the centralized DCA schemes are:

- First available (FA): the first available channel satisfying reuse distance requirement is assigned to the call
- Locally optimized dynamic assignment (LODA): cost function is based on the future blocking probability in the neighboring cells
- Selection with maximum usage on the reuse ring (RING): a candidate channel is selected which is in use in the most cells in the co-channel set

DCA and DFS eliminate the tedious manual frequency planning work. DCA also handles bursty cell traffic and utilizes the cellular radio resources more efficiently. DCA allows the number of channels in a cell to vary with the traffic load, hence increasing channel capacity with little costs.

== Spread spectrum ==
Spread spectrum can be considered as an alternative to complex DCA algorithms. Spread spectrum avoids cochannel interference between adjacent cells, since the probability that users in nearby cells use the same spreading code is insignificant. Thus the frequency channel allocation problem is relaxed in cellular networks based on a combination of spread spectrum and FDMA, for example IS95 and 3G systems. Spread spectrum also facilitate that centrally controlled base stations dynamically borrow resources from each other depending on the traffic load, simply by increasing the maximum allowed number of simultaneous users in one cell (the maximum allowed interference level from the users in the cell), and decreasing it in an adjacent cell. Users in the overlap between the base station coverage area can be transferred between the cells (called cell-breathing), or the traffic can be regulated by admission control and traffic-shaping.

However, spread spectrum gives lower spectral efficiency than non-spread spectrum techniques, if the channel allocation in the latter case is optimized by a good DCA scheme. Especially OFDM modulation is an interesting alternative to spread spectrum because of its ability to combat multipath propagation for wideband channels without complex equalization. OFDM can be extended with OFDMA for uplink multiple access among users in the same cell. For avoidance of inter-cell interference, FDMA with DCA or DFS is once again of interest. One example of this concept is the above-mentioned IEEE 802.11h standard. OFDM and OFDMA with DCA is often studied as an alternative for 4G wireless systems.

== DCA on a packet-by-packet basis ==
In packet based data communication services, the communication is bursty and the traffic load rapidly changing. For high system spectrum efficiency, DCA should be performed on a packet-by-packet basis. Examples of algorithms for packet-by-packet DCA are Dynamic Packet Assignment (DPA), Dynamic Single Frequency Networks (DSFN) and Packet and resource plan scheduling (PARPS).

== See also ==
- Cellular traffic
- Cognitive radio
- Dynamic bandwidth allocation (DBA)
