= IEEE 802.11h-2003 =

WiFi specification

IEEE 802.11h-2003, or simply 802.11h, refers to a 2003 amendment added to the IEEE 802.11 standard for Spectrum and Transmit Power Management Extensions. It addresses problems like interference with satellites and radar using the same 5 GHz frequency band. It was originally designed to address European regulations but is now applicable in many other countries. The standard provides Dynamic Frequency Selection (DFS) and Transmit Power Control (TPC) to the 802.11a PHY. It has since been integrated into the full IEEE 802.11-2007 standard.

== Motivation ==
Wireless technology has been more and more popular and a lot of standards have been finalized over the past decade. This holds especially for ISM bands (Industrial, Scientific and Medical) which are unlicensed and free to use. The problem, however, is the coexistence between these heterogeneous wireless networks. To address the coexistence problems in those bands, the IEEE has started the 802.11h Working Group to make recommendations for better future coexistence. It addresses problems like interference with satellites and radar using the same 5 GHz frequency band.

== See also ==
- Channel allocation schemes
- List of WLAN channels
