= Hold time =

Hold time may refer to:

- In digital electronics, the minimum amount of time the data input should be held steady after the clock event for reliable sampling; see Flip-flop (electronics)#Timing considerations
- The amount of time spent in a phone queue on hold (telephone)
- Hold Time (album), by M. Ward

== See also ==
- Holding time (disambiguation)
