= Dynamic frequency selection =

Wi-Fi channel allocation scheme

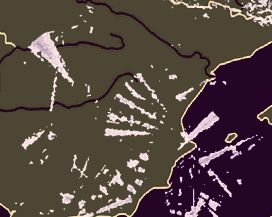
Interference by 5 GHz Wi-Fi seen on Doppler weather radar

Dynamic frequency selection (DFS) is a channel allocation scheme specified for wireless LANs, commonly known as Wi-Fi. It is designed to prevent electromagnetic interference by avoiding co-channel operation with systems that predated Wi-Fi, such as military radar, satellite communication, and weather radar, and also to provide on aggregate a near-uniform loading of the spectrum (uniform spreading). It was standardized in 2003 as part of IEEE 802.11h.

== Radar detection mechanism ==
When starting operation, an access point automatically selects channels with low interference levels in a phase known as Channel Availability Check (CAC). During this phase, the access point is in a passive state scanning for radar signals. This commonly takes one to two minutes, but could take up to ten minutes. Thereafter, the access point performs In-Service Monitoring (ISM) to detect active radar signals; if radar is detected, and the access point is configured to automatically select a channel, it broadcasts a switch-channel event to its clients and follows by switching the channel.

The actual mechanism, durations, radar pulse pattern, power levels, and frequency bands on which DFS is enforced vary by jurisdiction. DFS is mandated for the 5250-5350 MHz and 5470–5725 MHz U-NII bands in the United States by the FCC. DFS is mandatory for the 5250–5350 and 5470–5725 MHz bands in India.

== Weather radar interference ==
Prior to the introduction of Wi-Fi, one of the biggest applications of the 5 GHz band was Terminal Doppler Weather Radar. The decision to use the 5 GHz spectrum for Wi-Fi was finalized in the World Radiocommunication Conference in 2003; however, the meteorological community was not involved in the process. Implementation and configuration problems caused significant disruption in weather radar operations in countries around the world. In Hungary, the weather radar system was declared non-operational for more than a month. Due to the severity of interference, South African weather services ended up abandoning C band (4-8 GHz) operation, switching their radar network to S band (2-4 GHz).

== Uniform spreading ==
Uniform spreading is a mechanism used to provide an aggregated uniform load across all allocated channels within the declared spectrum mask. There are several ways in which this can be achieved, either on-device or in a WLAN controller.

== See also ==
- Automated Frequency Coordination
