= List of WLAN channels =

Wireless LAN (WLAN) channels are frequently accessed using IEEE 802.11 protocols. The 802.11 standard provides several radio frequency bands for use in Wi-Fi communications, each divided into a multitude of frequency channels numbered at 5 MHz spacing (except in the 45/60 GHz band, where they are 0.54/1.08/2.16 GHz apart) between the centre frequency of the channel. The standards allow for channels to be bonded together into wider channels for faster throughput.

== 860/900 MHz (802.11ah) ==
802.11ah operates in sub-gigahertz unlicensed bands. There are two main bands in use, with Europe mainly using 860 MHz, and the rest of the world mostly using 900 MHz.

=== 860 MHz ===
F_{0} index		F_{0} (MHz)	Frequency range (MHz)	Europe	Singapore	Rest of world
1 MHz	2 MHz	F_{0} (MHz)	Frequency range (MHz)	Europe	Singapore	Rest of world
1	No	863.5	863–864	Yes	No	No
3	No	864.5	864–865	Yes	No	No
5	6	865.5	865–866	Yes	No	No
7	6	866.5	866–867	Yes	Yes	No
9	10	867.5	867–868	Yes	Yes	No
11	10	868.5	868–869	No	Yes	No

=== 900 MHz ===
Each world region supports different sub-bands, and the channel numbers depend on the starting frequency on the sub-band it belongs to. Therefore there is no global channel numbering plan, and the channel numbers are incompatible between world regions (and even between sub-bands of a same world region). However, for the purposes of illustration, the following table lists all the worldwide permitted frequencies with the channel numbers assigned to the region with the largest number of permitted frequencies, the United States.

F_{0} index						F_{0} (MHz)	Frequency range (MHz)	Australia New Zealand	Europe	Japan	Korea	Singapore	Taiwan	United States	Rest of world
1 MHz	2 MHz		4 MHz	8 MHz	16 MHz	F_{0} (MHz)	Frequency range (MHz)	Australia New Zealand	Europe	Japan	Korea	Singapore	Taiwan	United States	Rest of world
1	2		No	No	No	902.5	902–903	No	No	No	No	No	No	Yes	No
3	2		No	No	No	903.5	903–904	No	No	No	No	No	No	Yes	No
5	6		8	12	20	904.5	904–905	No	No	No	No	No	No	Yes	No
7	6		8	12	20	905.5	905–906	No	No	No	No	No	No	Yes	No
9	10		8	12	20	906.5	906–907	No	No	No	No	No	No	Yes	No
11	10		8	12	20	907.5	907–908	No	No	No	No	No	No	Yes	No
13	14		16	12	20	908.5	908–909	No	No	No	No	No	No	Yes	No
15	14		16	12	20	909.5	909–910	No	No	No	No	No	No	Yes	No
17	18		16	12	20	910.5	910–911	No	No	No	No	No	No	Yes	No
19	18		16	12	20	911.5	911–912	No	No	No	No	No	No	Yes	No
21	22		24	28	20	912.5	912–913	No	No	No	No	No	No	Yes	No
23	22		24	28	20	913.5	913–914	No	No	No	No	No	No	Yes	No
25	26		24	28	20	914.5	914–915	No	No	No	No	No	No	Yes	No
27	26		24	28	20	915.5	915–916	Yes	No	No	No	No	No	Yes	No
29	30		32	28	20	916.5	916–917	Yes	No	No	No	No	No	Yes	No
31	30		32	28	20	917.5	917–918	Yes	Yes (Note: All channels for Europe are shifted down by 0.6 MHz, starting at 916.4 MHz instead of 917 MHz as shown, to fit in the 916.4–919.4 MHz band.)	No	No	Yes	No	Yes	No
33	34		32	28	20	918.5	918–919	Yes	Yes	No	Yes (Note: All channels for Korea are shifted down by 0.5 MHz, starting at 917.5 MHz instead of 918 MHz as shown, to fit in the 917.5–931 MHz band.)	Yes	No	Yes	No
35	34		32	28	20	919.5	919–920	Yes	Yes	No	Yes	Yes	No	Yes	No
37	38		40	44	No	920.5	920–921	Yes	No	No	Yes	Yes	Yes	Yes	No
39	38		40	44	No	921.5	921–922	Yes	No	Yes (Note: All channels for Japan are shifted down by 0.5 MHz, starting at 920.5 MHz instead of 921 MHz as shown, to fit in the 920.5–927.5 MHz band.)	Yes	Yes	Yes	Yes	No
41	42		40	44	No	922.5	922–923	Yes	No	Yes	Yes	Yes	Yes	Yes	No
43	42		40	44	No	923.5	923–924	Yes	No	Yes	Yes	Yes	Yes	Yes	No
45	46		48	44	No	924.5	924–925	Yes	No	Yes	No	Yes	Yes	Yes	No
47	46		48	44	No	925.5	925–926	Yes	No	Yes	No	No	No	Yes	No
49	50	—N/a	48	44	No	926.5	926–927	Yes	No	Yes	No	No	No	Yes	No
51	50	52KR	48	44	No	927.5	927–928	Yes	No	Yes	Yes	No	No	Yes	No
53	54	52KR	No	No	No	928.5	928–929	No	No	No	Yes	No	No	No	No
55	54	56KR	No	No	No	929.5	929–930	No	No	No	Yes	No	No	No	No
57	—N/a	56KR	No	No	No	930.5	930–931	No	No	No	Yes	No	No	No	No
1 MHz	2 MHz		4 MHz	8 MHz	16 MHz	F_{0} (MHz)	Frequency range (MHz)	Australia New Zealand	Europe	Japan	Korea	Singapore	Taiwan	United States	Rest of world
Notes:

Indonesia permits use in the 920–923 MHz band, however only with 250 kHz channels, below the minimum 1 MHz required for 802.11ah.

== 2.4 GHz (802.11b/g/n/ax/be/bn) ==
14 channels are designated in the 2.4 GHz range, spaced 5 MHz apart from each other except for a 12 MHz space before channel 14. The abbreviation F_{0} designates each channel's fundamental frequency.

#	F_{0} (MHz)	DSSS						OFDM													Most of world	North America	Japan
#	F_{0} (MHz)	Frequency range (MHz)	Channel 22 MHz					Frequency range (MHz)	Channel 20 MHz				Center frequency index 40 MHz								Most of world	North America	Japan
1	2412	2401–2423	1	2	3	—N/a	—N/a	2402–2422	1	2	3	—N/a	3	—N/a	4	—N/a	5	—N/a	—N/a	—N/a	Yes	Yes	Yes
2	2417	2406–2428	1	2	3	4	—N/a	2407–2427	1	2	3	4	3	—N/a	4	—N/a	5	—N/a	6	—N/a	Yes	Yes	Yes
3	2422	2411–2433	1	2	3	4	5	2412–2432	5	2	3	4	3	7	4	—N/a	5	—N/a	6	—N/a	Yes	Yes	Yes
4	2427	2416–2438	6	2	3	4	5	2417–2437	5	6	3	4	3	7	4	8	5	—N/a	6	—N/a	Yes	Yes	Yes
5	2432	2421–2443	6	7	3	4	5	2422–2442	5	6	7	4	3	7	4	8	5	9	6	—N/a	Yes	Yes	Yes
6	2437	2426–2448	6	7	8	4	5	2427–2447	5	6	7	8	3	7	4	8	5	9	6	10	Yes	Yes	Yes
7	2442	2431–2453	6	7	8	9	5	2432–2452	9	6	7	8	11	7	4	8	5	9	6	10	Yes	Yes	Yes
8	2447	2436–2458	6	7	8	9	10	2437–2457	9	10	7	8	11	7	—N/a	8	5	9	6	10	Yes	Yes	Yes
9	2452	2441–2463	11	7	8	9	10	2442–2462	9	10	11	8	11	7	—N/a	8	—N/a	9	6	10	Yes	Yes	Yes
10	2457	2446–2468	11	12	8	9	10	2447–2467	9	10	11	12	11	7	—N/a	8	—N/a	9	—N/a	10	Yes	Yes	Yes
11	2462	2451–2473	11	12	13	9	10	2452–2472	13	10	11	12	11	—N/a	—N/a	8	—N/a	9	—N/a	10	Yes	Yes	Yes
12	2467	2456–2478	11	12	13	—N/a	10	2457–2477	13	—N/a	11	12	11	—N/a	—N/a	—N/a	—N/a	9	—N/a	10	Yes	Avoided^{B}	Yes
13	2472	2461–2483	11	12	13	—N/a	—N/a	2462–2482	13	—N/a	—N/a	12	11	—N/a	—N/a	—N/a	—N/a	—N/a	—N/a	10	Yes	Avoided^{B}	Yes
14	2484	2474–2494	14	12	13	—N/a	—N/a	—N/a													No	No	11b only^{C}
Notes:^AIn the 2.4 GHz bands bonded 40 MHz channels are uniquely named by the primary and secondary 20 MHz channels, e.g. 9+13. In the 5 GHz bands they are denoted by the center of the wider band and the primary 20 MHz channel e.g. 42[40]^BIn the US, 802.11 operation on channels 12 and 13 is allowed under low-power conditions. The 2.4 GHz Part 15 band in the US allows spread-spectrum operation as long as the 50 dB bandwidth of the signal is within the range of 2,400–2,483.5 MHz, which fully encompasses channels 1 through 13. A Federal Communications Commission (FCC) document clarifies that only channel 14 is forbidden and that low-power transmitters with low-gain antennas may operate legally in channels 12 and 13. Channels 12 and 13 are nevertheless not normally used in order to avoid any potential interference in the adjacent restricted frequency band, 2,483.5–2,500 MHz, which is subject to strict emission limits set out in 47 CFR § 15.205. Per recent FCC Order 16–181, "an authorized access point device can only operate in the 2483.5–2495 MHz band when it is operating under the control of a Globalstar Network Operating Center and that a client device can only operate in the 2483.5–2495 MHz band when it is operating under the control of an authorized access point"^CChannel 14 is valid only for DSSS and CCK modes (Clause 18 a.k.a. 802.11b) in Japan. OFDM (i.e., 802.11g) may not be used. (IEEE 802.11-2007 § 19.4.2) Nations apply their own RF emission regulations to the allowable channels, allowed users and maximum power levels within these frequency ranges. Network operators should consult their local authorities as these regulations may be out of date as they are subject to change at any time. Most of the world will allow the first thirteen channels in the spectrum.

Interference happens when two networks try to operate in the same band, or when their bands overlap. The two modulation methods used have different characteristics of band usage and therefore occupy different widths:

- The DSSS method used by legacy 802.11 and 802.11b (and the 11b-compatible rates of 11 g) occupies 22 MHz of bandwidth. This is from the 11 MHz chip rate used by the coding system. No guard band is prescribed; the channel definition provides 3 MHz between 1, 6, and 11.
- The OFDM method used by 802.11g and 802.11n occupies a bandwidth of 16.25 MHz. The nameplate bandwidth is set to be 20 MHz, rounding up to a multiple of channel width and providing some guard band for signal to attenuate along the edge of the band. This guardband is mainly used to accommodate older routers with modem chipsets prone to full channel occupancy, as most modern Wi‑Fi routers are not prone to excessive channel occupancy.

Graphical representation of Wireless LAN channels in 2.4 GHz band. Channels 12 and 13 are customarily unused in the United States. As a result, the usual 20 MHz allocation becomes 1/6/11, the same as 11b.

While overlapping frequencies can be configured at a location and will usually work, it can cause interference resulting in slowdowns, sometimes severe, particularly in heavy use. Certain subsets of frequencies can be used simultaneously at any one location without interference (see diagrams for typical allocations). The consideration of spacing stems from both the basic bandwidth occupation (described above), which depends on the protocol, and from attenuation of interfering signals over distance. In the worst case, using every fourth or fifth channel by leaving three or four channels clear between used channels causes minimal interference, and narrower spacing still can be used at further distances. The "interference" is usually not actual bit-errors, but the wireless transmitters making space for each other. Interference resulting in bit-error is rare. The requirement of the standard is for a transmitter to yield when it decodes another at a level of 3 dB above the noise floor, or when the non-decoded noise level is higher than a threshold P_{th} which, for Wi-Fi 5 and earlier, is between -76 and -80 dBm.

As shown in the diagram, bonding two 20 MHz channels to form a 40 MHz channel is permitted in the 2.4 GHz bands. These are generally referred to by the centres of the primary 20 MHz channel and the adjacent secondary 20 MHz channel (e.g. 1+5, 9+13, 13–9, 5–1). The primary 20 MHz channel is used for signalling and backwards compatibility, the secondary is only used when sending data at full speed.

== 3.65 GHz (802.11y) ==
Except where noted, all information taken from Annex J of IEEE 802.11y-2008

This range is documented as only being allowed as a licensed band in the United States. However, not in the original specification, under newer frequency allocations from the FCC, it falls under the 3.55–3.7 GHz Citizens Broadband Radio Service band. This allows for unlicensed use, under Tier 3 GAA rules, provided that the user doesn't cause harmful interference to Incumbent Access users or Priority Access Licensees and accepts all interference from these users, and also follows all the technical requirements in CFR 47 Part 96 Subpart E.

A 40 MHz band is available from 3655 to 3695 MHz. It may be divided into eight 5 MHz channels, four 10 MHz channels, or two 20 MHz channels.

The division into 5 MHz channels consumes all eight possible channel numbers, and so (unlike other bands) it is not possible to infer the width of a channel from its number. Instead each wider channel shares its channel number with the 5 MHz channel just above its mid frequency:

- channel 132 can be either 3660-3665 or 3655-3665;
- channel 133 can be either 3665-3670 or 3655-3675;

and so on.

Channel	Span		
Channel	5 MHz	10 MHz	20 MHz
131	3655–3660 (F_{0}=3657.5)	3655–3665 (F_{0}=3660)	3655–3675 (F_{0}=3665)
132	3660–3665 (F_{0}=3662.5)	3655–3665 (F_{0}=3660)	3655–3675 (F_{0}=3665)
133	3665–3670 (F_{0}=3667.5)	3665–3675 (F_{0}=3670)	3655–3675 (F_{0}=3665)
134	3670–3675 (F_{0}=3672.5)	3665–3675 (F_{0}=3670)	3655–3675 (F_{0}=3665)
135	3675–3680 (F_{0}=3677.5)	3675–3685 (F_{0}=3680)	3675–3695 (F_{0}=3685)
136	3680–3685 (F_{0}=3682.5)	3675–3685 (F_{0}=3680)	3675–3695 (F_{0}=3685)
137	3685–3690 (F_{0}=3687.5)	3685–3695 (F_{0}=3690)	3675–3695 (F_{0}=3685)
138	3690–3695 (F_{0}=3692.5)	3685–3695 (F_{0}=3690)	3675–3695 (F_{0}=3685)

== 4.9–5.0 GHz (802.11j) WLAN ==
Channel	Center frequency (MHz)	Frequency range (MHz)	Channel			Japan	United States
Channel	Center frequency (MHz)	Frequency range (MHz)	10 MHz	20 MHz	40 MHz	Japan	United States
184	4920	4910–4930	183, 184, 185	184	184+188; 188-184	Registration required	—N/a
188	4940	4930–4950	187, 188, 189	188	184+188; 188-184	Registration required	—N/a
192	4960	4950–4970	—N/a	192	192+196; 196-192	Registration required	—N/a
196	4980	4970–4990	—N/a	196	192+196; 196-192	Registration required	—N/a
(191)	4955	4945–4965	11, 13, 15	21	No	—N/a	Yes
(195)	4975	4965–4985	15, 17, 19	25	No	—N/a	Yes
8	5040	5030–5050	7, 8, 9	8	No	Revoked	—N/a
12	5060	5050–5070	11, —	12	No	Revoked	—N/a
16	5080	5070–5090	—N/a	16	No	Revoked	—N/a

In Japan since 2002, 80 MHz of spectrum from 4910 to 4990 MHz has been available for both indoor and outdoor use, once registered.

Until 2017, an additional 60 MHz of spectrum from 5030 to 5090 MHz was available for registered use, however it has since been re-purposed and can no longer be used.

50 MHz of spectrum from 4940 to 4990 MHz (WLAN channels 20–26) are in use by public safety entities in the United States. Within this spectrum there are two non-overlapping channels allocated, each 20 MHz wide. The most commonly used channels are 22 and 24.

== 5 GHz (802.11a/h/n/ac/ax/be/bn) ==
Ch. 20 MHz	F_{0} (MHz)	Frequency range (MHz)	F_{0} index			US FCC U-NII band(s)	Australia	United States	Canada	United Kingdom	Europe	Russia	Japan	India	Singa- pore	Hong Kong SAR of the PRC	China	Israel	Korea	Turkey	South Africa	Brazil	Taiwan	New Zealand	Bahrain	Vietnam	Indonesia	Philippines
Ch. 20 MHz	F_{0} (MHz)	Frequency range (MHz)	40 MHz	80 MHz	160 MHz	US FCC U-NII band(s)	Australia	United States	Canada	United Kingdom	Europe	Russia	Japan	India	Singa- pore	Hong Kong SAR of the PRC	China	Israel	Korea	Turkey	South Africa	Brazil	Taiwan	New Zealand	Bahrain	Vietnam	Indonesia	Philippines
32	5160	5150–5170	No	No	No	U-NII-1	Indoors	Yes (Note: limited to 1000 mW e.i.r.p. "New rules for U-NII bands" (PDF). 22 October 2014.)	Indoors	Indoors/TPC (Note: Transmit power / Power density: Max. 200 mW e.i.r.p. Max. 10 mW/MHz e.i.r.p. density in any 1 MHz band. WAS/RLANs operating in the band 5250–5350 MHz shall either employ transmitter power control (TPC), which provides, on average, a mitigation factor of at least 3 dB on the maximum permitted output power of the systems; or if transmitter power control is not in use, the maximum permitted e.i.r.p. and the corresponding e.i.r.p. density limits shall be reduced by 3 dB. Type of Antenna: integral or dedicated. Max. 25 mW e.i.r.p. (5150–5250 MHz) inside cars for RLAN use. RLAN use inside cars (passenger cars, lorries, buses) in the band 5150–5250 MHz is allowed at a maximum e.i.r.p. of 25 mW. EN 301 893 / ECC/DEC/(04)08 / ERC/REC 70-03, Annex A.) (Note: Channel access and occupation rules: WAS/RLANs operating in the band 5250–5350 MHz shall use mitigation techniques that give at least the same protection as the detection, operational and response requirements described in EN 301 893 to ensure compatible operation with radiodetermination systems (radars). Such mitigation techniques shall equalise the probability of selecting a specific channel for all available channels so as to ensure, on average, a near-uniform spread of spectrum loading. The equipment shall implement an adequate spectrum sharing mechanism in order to facilitate sharing between the various technologies and applications. The adequate spectrum sharing mechanism can be e.g. LBT (Listen Before Talk), DAA (Detect And Avoid) or any other mechanism providing a similar level of mitigation. EN 301 893 / ECC/DEC/(04)08 / ERC/REC 70-03, Annex A.)	Indoors/TPC	Indoors/TPC (Note: limited to 200 mW)	Indoors	Yes	Yes	Indoors	Indoors	Indoors	Indoors	Indoors	Unknown	Indoors/TPC	Yes	Indoors	Indoors	Indoors	Indoors	Indoors
36	5180	5170–5190	38	42	50	U-NII-1	Indoors	Yes	Indoors	Indoors/TPC	Indoors/TPC	Indoors/TPC	Indoors	Yes	Yes	Indoors	Indoors	Indoors	Indoors	Indoors	Indoors/DFS/ TPC	Indoors/TPC	Yes	Indoors	Indoors	Indoors	Indoors	Indoors
40	5200	5190–5210	38	42	50	U-NII-1	Indoors	Yes	Indoors	Indoors/TPC	Indoors/TPC	Indoors/TPC	Indoors	Yes	Yes	Indoors	Indoors	Indoors	Indoors	Indoors	Indoors/DFS/ TPC	Indoors/TPC	Yes	Indoors	Indoors	Indoors	Indoors	Indoors
44	5220	5210–5230	46	42	50	U-NII-1	Indoors	Yes	Indoors	Indoors/TPC	Indoors/TPC	Indoors/TPC	Indoors	Yes	Yes	Indoors	Indoors	Indoors	Indoors	Indoors	Indoors/DFS/ TPC	Indoors/TPC	Yes	Indoors	Indoors	Indoors	Indoors	Indoors
48	5240	5230–5250	46	42	50	U-NII-1	Indoors	Yes	Indoors	Indoors/TPC	Indoors/TPC	Indoors/TPC	Indoors	Yes	Yes	Indoors	Indoors	Indoors	Indoors (Note: limited to power density of 2.5 mW/MHz)	Indoors	Indoors/DFS/ TPC	Indoors/TPC	Yes	Indoors	Indoors	Indoors	Indoors	Indoors
52	5260	5250–5270	54	58	50	U-NII-2A	Indoors/DFS/ TPC (Note: limited to 100 mW instead of 200 mW without TPC)	DFS/TPC (Note: limited to 1000 mW e.i.r.p. for client and 4000 mW e.i.r.p. for master "New rules for U-NII bands" (PDF). 22 October 2014.)	DFS/TPC (Note: limited to 500 mW instead of 1 W without TPC)	Indoors/DFS /TPC	Indoors/DFS /TPC	Indoors/TPC	Indoors/DFS/ TPC	Indoors	DFS/TPC	Indoors/DFS (Note: HK local rule is limited to 200 mW hence TPC is not required, corresponding to U-NII)	DFS/TPC	Indoors/DFS/ TPC or	DFS/TPC	Indoors/DFS/ TPC	Indoors/DFS/ TPC	Indoors/DFS/ TPC	DFS	DFS/TPC	Indoors/DFS/ TPC or	DFS/TPC	Indoors	Indoors
56	5280	5270–5290	54	58	50	U-NII-2A	Indoors/DFS/ TPC	DFS/TPC	DFS/TPC	Indoors/DFS /TPC	Indoors/DFS /TPC	Indoors/TPC	Indoors/DFS/ TPC	Indoors	DFS/TPC	Indoors/DFS	DFS/TPC	Indoors/DFS/ TPC or	DFS/TPC	Indoors/DFS/ TPC	Indoors/DFS/ TPC	Indoors/DFS/ TPC	DFS	DFS/TPC	Indoors/DFS/ TPC or	DFS/TPC	Indoors	Indoors
60	5300	5290–5310	62	58	50	U-NII-2A	Indoors/DFS/ TPC	DFS/TPC	DFS/TPC	Indoors/DFS /TPC	Indoors/DFS /TPC	Indoors/TPC	Indoors/DFS/ TPC	Indoors	DFS/TPC	Indoors/DFS	DFS/TPC	Indoors/DFS/ TPC or	DFS/TPC	Indoors/DFS/ TPC	Indoors/DFS/ TPC	Indoors/DFS/ TPC	DFS	DFS/TPC	Indoors/DFS/ TPC or	DFS/TPC	Indoors	Indoors
64	5320	5310–5330	62	58	50	U-NII-2A	Indoors/DFS/ TPC	DFS/TPC	DFS/TPC	Indoors/DFS /TPC	Indoors/DFS /TPC	Indoors/TPC	Indoors/DFS/ TPC	Indoors	DFS/TPC	Indoors/DFS	DFS/TPC	Indoors/DFS/ TPC or	DFS/TPC	Indoors/DFS/ TPC	Indoors/DFS/ TPC	Indoors/DFS/ TPC	DFS	DFS/TPC	Indoors/DFS/ TPC or	DFS/TPC	Indoors	Indoors
68	5340	5330–5350	70	74	82	U-NII-2A	Indoors/DFS/ TPC	DFS/TPC	DFS/TPC	Indoors/DFS /TPC	Indoors/DFS /TPC	Indoors/TPC	Indoors/DFS/ TPC	Indoors/DFS/TPC	DFS/TPC	Indoors/DFS	DFS/TPC	Indoors/DFS/ TPC or	DFS/TPC	Indoors/DFS/ TPC	Unknown	Indoors/DFS/ TPC	DFS	DFS/TPC	Indoors/DFS/ TPC or	DFS/TPC	Indoors	Indoors
72	5360	5350–5370	70	74	82	U-NII-2B	Unused																					
76	5380	5370–5390	78	74	82	U-NII-2B	Unused																					
80	5400	5390–5410	78	74	82	U-NII-2B	Unused																					
84	5420	5410–5430	86	90	82	U-NII-2B	Unused																					
88	5440	5430–5450	86	90	82	U-NII-2B	Unused																					
92	5460	5450–5470	94	90	82	U-NII-2B	Unused																					
96	5480	5470–5490	94	90	82	U-NII-2C	DFS/TPC	DFS/TPC	DFS/TPC	DFS/TPC (Note: Transmit power / Power density: Max. 1 W e.i.r.p. Max. 50 mW/MHz e.i.r.p. density in any 1 MHz band. WAS/RLANs operating in the band 5470–5725 MHz shall either employ transmitter power control (TPC), which provides, on average, a mitigation factor of at least 3 dB on the maximum permitted output power of the systems; or if transmitter power control is not in use, the maximum permitted e.i.r.p. and the corresponding e.i.r.p. density limits shall be reduced by 3 dB. Type of Antenna: integral or dedicated. EN 301 893 / ECC/DEC/(04)08 /-.) (Note: Channel access and occupation rules: WAS/RLANs operating in the bands 5470–5725 MHz shall use mitigation techniques that give at least the same protection as the detection, operational and response requirements described in EN 301 893 to ensure compatible operation with radiodetermination systems (radars). Such mitigation techniques shall equalise the probability of selecting a specific channel for all available channels so as to ensure, on average, a near-uniform spread of spectrum loading. The equipment shall implement an adequate spectrum sharing mechanism in order to facilitate sharing between the various technologies and applications. The adequate spectrum sharing mechanism can be e.g. LBT (Listen Before Talk), DAA (Detect And Avoid) or any other mechanism providing a similar level of mitigation. EN 301 893 / ECC/DEC/(04)08 /-.)	DFS/TPC	No	DFS/TPC	Yes	DFS/TPC	Indoors/DFS/TPC	No	Indoors/DFS/ TPC or (Note: limited to power density of 14 dBm/MHz instead of 17 dBm/MHz without TPC)	DFS/TPC	DFS/TPC	Unknown	DFS/TPC	DFS	DFS/TPC	No	DFS/TPC	No	Indoors
100	5500	5490–5510	102	106	114	U-NII-2C	DFS/TPC	DFS/TPC	DFS/TPC	DFS/TPC	DFS/TPC	No	DFS/TPC	Yes	DFS/TPC	Indoors/DFS/TPC	No	Indoors/DFS/ TPC or	DFS/TPC	DFS/TPC	Yes	DFS/TPC	DFS	DFS/TPC	No	DFS/TPC	No	Indoors
104	5520	5510–5530	102	106	114	U-NII-2C	DFS/TPC	DFS/TPC	DFS/TPC	DFS/TPC	DFS/TPC	No	DFS/TPC	DFS/TPC (Note: Transmit power control mechanism may not be required for systems with an e.i.r.p. of less than 500 mW. Ref- section 3 (iv) G.S.R. 1048(E). dt 18 October 2018)	DFS/TPC	Indoors/DFS/TPC	No	Indoors/DFS/ TPC or	DFS/TPC	DFS/TPC	Yes	DFS/TPC	DFS	DFS/TPC	No	DFS/TPC	No	Indoors
108	5540	5530–5550	110	106	114	U-NII-2C	DFS/TPC	DFS/TPC	DFS/TPC	DFS/TPC	DFS/TPC	No	DFS/TPC	DFS/TPC	DFS/TPC	Indoors/DFS/TPC	No	Indoors/DFS/ TPC or	DFS/TPC	DFS/TPC	Yes	DFS/TPC	DFS	DFS/TPC	No	DFS/TPC	No	Indoors
112	5560	5550–5570	110	106	114	U-NII-2C	DFS/TPC	DFS/TPC	DFS/TPC	DFS/TPC	DFS/TPC	No	DFS/TPC	DFS/TPC	DFS/TPC	Indoors/DFS/TPC	No	Indoors/DFS/ TPC or	DFS/TPC	DFS/TPC	Yes	DFS/TPC	DFS	DFS/TPC	No	DFS/TPC	No	Indoors
116	5580	5570–5590	118	122	114	U-NII-2C	DFS/TPC	DFS/TPC	DFS/TPC	DFS/TPC	DFS/TPC	No	DFS/TPC	DFS/TPC	DFS/TPC	Indoors/DFS/TPC	No	Indoors/DFS/ TPC or	DFS/TPC	DFS/TPC	Yes	DFS/TPC	DFS	DFS/TPC	No	DFS/TPC	No	Indoors
120	5600	5590–5610	118	122	114	U-NII-2C	Registration required	DFS/TPC	DFS/TPC	DFS/TPC	DFS/TPC	No	DFS/TPC	DFS/TPC	DFS/TPC	Indoors/DFS/TPC	No	Indoors/DFS/ TPC or	DFS/TPC	DFS/TPC	Yes	DFS/TPC	DFS	DFS/TPC	No	DFS/TPC	No	Indoors
124	5620	5610–5630	126	122	114	U-NII-2C	Registration required	DFS/TPC	DFS/TPC	DFS/TPC	DFS/TPC	No	DFS/TPC	DFS/TPC	DFS/TPC	Indoors/DFS/TPC	No	Indoors/DFS/ TPC or	DFS/TPC	DFS/TPC	Yes	DFS/TPC	DFS	DFS/TPC	No	DFS/TPC	No	Indoors
128	5640	5630–5650	126	122	114	U-NII-2C	Registration required	DFS/TPC	DFS/TPC	DFS/TPC	DFS/TPC	No	DFS/TPC	DFS/TPC	DFS/TPC	Indoors/DFS/TPC	No	Indoors/DFS/ TPC or	DFS/TPC	DFS/TPC	Yes	DFS/TPC	DFS	DFS/TPC	No	DFS/TPC	No	Indoors
132	5660	5650–5670	134	138	No	U-NII-2C	DFS/TPC	DFS/TPC	DFS/TPC	DFS/TPC	DFS/SRD ch 138 & 142; DFS/TPC otherwise	Indoors/TPC	DFS/TPC	DFS/TPC	DFS/TPC	Indoors/DFS/TPC	No	Indoors/DFS/ TPC or	DFS/TPC	DFS/TPC	Yes	DFS/TPC	DFS	DFS/TPC	No	DFS/TPC	No	Indoors
136	5680	5670–5690	134	138	No	U-NII-2C	DFS/TPC	DFS/TPC	DFS/TPC	DFS/TPC	DFS/SRD ch 138 & 142; DFS/TPC otherwise	Indoors/TPC	DFS/TPC	DFS/TPC	DFS/TPC	Indoors/DFS/TPC	No	Indoors/DFS/ TPC or	DFS/TPC	DFS/TPC	Yes	DFS/TPC	DFS	DFS/TPC	No	DFS/TPC	No	Indoors
140	5700	5690–5710	142	138	No	U-NII-2C	DFS/TPC	DFS/TPC	DFS/TPC	DFS/TPC	DFS/SRD ch 138 & 142; DFS/TPC otherwise	Indoors/TPC	DFS/TPC	DFS/TPC	DFS/TPC	Indoors/DFS/TPC	No	Indoors/DFS/ TPC or	DFS/TPC	DFS/TPC	Yes	DFS/TPC	DFS	DFS/TPC	No	DFS/TPC	No	Indoors
144	5720	5710–5730	142	138	No	U-NII-2C/3	DFS/TPC	DFS/TPC	DFS/TPC	DFS/TPC	SRD (Note: short range devices limited to 25 mW EIRP "Relating to the use of Short Range Devices (SRD)". ECC. 13 October 2017.)	Indoors/TPC	DFS/TPC	DFS/TPC	DFS/TPC	Indoors/DFS/TPC	No	Indoors (Note: limited to power density of 10 dBm/MHz, limited to 25 mW)	DFS/TPC	No	No	DFS/TPC	DFS	DFS/TPC	No	DFS/TPC	No	Indoors
		5730–5735	—N/a			U-NII-3	Unknown				SRD	Indoors/TPC	Unknown															Indoors
149	5745	5735–5755	151	155	163	U-NII-3	Yes (Note: limited to power density of 14 dbm/3kHz.)	Yes (Note: limited to 4000 mW e.i.r.p. "New rules for U-NII bands" (PDF). 22 October 2014.)	Yes	SRD (200 mW)	SRD	Indoors/TPC	No	Indoors	Yes	Indoors	Yes	Indoors	Yes	No	No	Yes	Yes	Yes	DFS/TPC/ Fixed	Yes	Yes	Indoors
153	5765	5755–5775	151	155	163	U-NII-3	Yes	Yes	Yes	SRD (200 mW)	SRD	Indoors/TPC	No	Indoors	Yes	Indoors	Yes	Indoors	Yes	No	No	Yes	Yes	Yes	DFS/TPC/ Fixed	Yes	Yes	Indoors
157	5785	5775–5795	159	155	163	U-NII-3	Yes	Yes	Yes	SRD (200 mW)	SRD	Indoors/TPC	No	Indoors	Yes	Indoors	Yes	Indoors	Yes	No	No	Yes	Yes	Yes	DFS/TPC/ Fixed	Yes	Yes	Indoors
161	5805	5795–5815	159	155	163	U-NII-3	Yes	Yes	Yes	SRD (200 mW)	SRD	Indoors/TPC	No	Indoors	Yes	Indoors	Yes	Indoors	Yes	No	No	Yes	Yes	Yes	DFS/TPC/ Fixed	Yes	Yes	Indoors
165	5825	5815–5835	167	171	163	U-NII-3	Yes	Yes	Yes	SRD (200 mW)	SRD	Indoors/TPC	No	Indoors	Yes	Indoors	Yes	Indoors	Yes	No	No	Yes	Yes	Yes	DFS/TPC/ Fixed	Yes	No	Indoors
169	5845	5835–5855	167	171	163	U-NII-3/4	Yes	Indoors (Note: In November 2020, the FCC ordered that the U-NII 4 spectrum between 5.850 and 5.925 GHz be split between 45 MHz for unlicensed use (from 5.850–5.895 GHz, indoors only) and 30 MHz dedicated to C-V2X for vehicles (from 5.895–5.925 GHz)."FCC Modernizes 5.9 GHz Band to Improve Wi-Fi and Automotive Safety | Federal Communications Commission". www.fcc.gov. 2020-11-20. U-NII 4 channels 169–177, for indoor use, has been allowed since May 2021. Power limits are specified in 47 CFR 15.407(a)(3)(ii)-(v)."47 CFR 15.407(a)(3)". National Archives Code of Federal Regulations. 2024-12-20.. Remaining DSRC licenses may be renewed, but no later than December 2026."Use of the 5.850-5.925 GHz Band". www.federalregister.gov. 13 December 2024.)	Yes	SRD (25 mW)	SRD	Indoors/TPC	No	Yes	No	No	No	Indoors	No	No	No	No	No	No	No	No	No	Indoors
173	5865	5855–5875	175	171	163	U-NII-4	Yes	Indoors	Yes	SRD (25 mW)	SRD	No	No	Yes	No	No	No	Indoors	No	No	No	No	No	No	No	No	No	No
177	5885	5875–5895	175	171	163	U-NII-4	No	Indoors	Yes	No	No	No	No	No	No	No	No	No	No	No	No	No	No	No	No	No	No	No
Ch. 20 MHz	F_{0} (MHz)	Frequency range (MHz)	40 MHz	80 MHz	160 MHz	US FCC U-NII band(s)	Australia	United States	Canada	United Kingdom	Europe	Russia	Japan	India	Singapore	Hong Kong SAR of the PRC	China	Israel	Korea	Turkey	South Africa	Brazil	Taiwan	New Zealand	Bahrain	Vietnam	Indonesia	Philippines
Notes:

Key
Text	Meaning
Yes	Compliant equipment may emit in this band without special restrictions.
No	Equipment shall not emit in this band.
Indoors	Equipment emitting in this band shall not be used outdoors.
DFS	Equipment must comply with DFS restrictions.
SRD	Equipment must comply with SRD restrictions.
Indoors/DFS	Equipment must comply with DFS restrictions and shall not be used outdoors.
Indoors/TPC	Equipment must comply with TPC restrictions and shall not be used outdoors.
DFS/TPC	Equipment must comply with DFS and TPC restrictions.
DFS/TPC + SRD	Equipment must comply with DFS, TPC, and SRD restrictions.
Indoors/DFS/TPC	Equipment must comply with DFS and TPC restrictions and shall not be used outdoors.
Registration required	Users must register with the applicable regulatory authority before using this band.
Unknown	Information regarding regulations in this band is not available.
Notes: Bradner, Scott O. (March 1997), Key Words for Use in RFCs to Indicate Requirement Levels, RFC 2119

=== Country-specific information ===
==== DFS and TPC ====
Source:

==== United States ====
In 2007, the FCC (United States) began requiring that devices operating in the bands of 5.250–5.350 GHz and 5.470–5.725 GHz must employ dynamic frequency selection (DFS) and transmit power control (TPC) capabilities. This is to avoid interference with weather-radar and military applications. In 2010, the FCC further clarified the use of channels in the 5.470–5.725 GHz band to avoid interference with Terminal Doppler Weather Radar (TDWR). In FCC parlance, these restrictions are now referred to collectively as the Old Rules. On 10 June 2015, the FCC approved a new ruleset for 5 GHz device operation (called the New Rules), which adds 160 and 80 MHz channel identifiers, and re-enables previously prohibited DFS channels, in Publication Number 905462. This FCC publication eliminates the ability for manufacturers to have devices approved or modified under the Old Rules in phases; the New Rules apply in all circumstances as of 2 June 2016.

==== United Kingdom ====
The UK's Ofcom regulations for unlicensed use of the 5 GHz band is similar to Europe, except that DFS is not required for the frequency range 5.725–5.850&nb_data/assets/pdf_file/0028/84970/ir-2030.pdf |title=IR 2030 Licence Exempt Short Range Devices (April 2021) |access-date=8 December 2021}}</ref>

Additionally, 5.925–6.425 GHz is

==== Germany ====
Germany requires DFS and TPC capabilities on 5.250–5.350 GHz and 5.470–5.725 GHz as well; in addition, the frequency range 5.150–5.350 GHz is allowed only for indoor use, leaving only 5.470–5.725 GHz for outdoor and indoor use.

Since this is the German implementation of EU Rule 2005/513/EC, similar regulations must be expected throughout the European Union.

European standard EN 301 893 covers 5.15–5.725 GHz operation, and as of 23 May 2017 v2.1.1 has been adopted. 6 GHz can now be used.

==== Austria ====
Austria adopted Decision 2005/513/EC directly into national law.

==== Japan ====
Japan's use of 10 and 20 MHz-wide 5 GHz wireless channels is codified by Association of Radio Industries and Businesses (ARIB) document STD-T71, Broadband Mobile Access Communication System (CSMA). Additional rule specifications relating to 40, 80, and 160 MHz channel allocation has been taken on by Japan's Ministry of Internal Affairs and Communications (MIC).

==== Brazil ====
In Brazil, the use of TPC is required in the 5.150–5.350 GHz and 5.470–5.725 GHz bands is required, but devices without TPC are allowed with a reduction of 3 dB. DFS is required in the 5.250–5.350 GHz and 5.470–5.725 GHz bands, and optional in the 5.150–5.250 GHz band.

==== Australia ====
As of 2015, some of the Australian channels require DFS to be utilised (a significant change from the 2000 regulations, which allowed lower power operation without DFS). As per AS/NZS 4268 B1 and B2, transmitters designed to operate in any part of 5250–5350 MHz and 5470–5725 MHz bands shall implement DFS in accordance with sections 4.7 and 5.3.8 and Annex D of ETSI EN 301 893 or alternatively in accordance with FCC paragraph 15.407(h)(2). Also as per AS/NZS 4268 B3 and B4, transmitters designed to operate in any part of 5250–5350 MHz and 5470–5725 MHz bands shall implement TPC in accordance with sections 4.4 and 5.3.4 of ETSI EN 301 893 or alternatively in accordance with FCC paragraph 15.407(h)(1).

==== New Zealand ====
New Zealand regulation differs from Australian.

==== Philippines ====
In the Philippines, the National Telecommunications Commission (NTC) allows the use of 5150 MHz to 5350 MHz and 5470 MHz to 5850 MHz frequency bands indoors with an effective radiated power (ERP) not exceeding 250 mW. Indoor Wireless Data Network (WDN) equipment and devices shall not use external antenna. All outdoor equipment/radio station whether for private WDN or public WDN shall be covered by appropriate permits and licenses required under existing rules and regulations.

==== Singapore ====
Singapore regulation requires DFS and TPC to be used in the 5.250–5.350 GHz band to transmit more than 100 mW effective radiated power (EIRP), but no more than 200 mW, and requires DFS capability on 5.250–5.350 GHz below or equal to 100 mW EIRP, and requires DFS and TPC capabilities on 5.470–5.725 below or equal to 1000 mW EIRP. Operating 5.725–5.850 GHz above 1000 mW and below or equal to 4000 mW EIRP shall be approved on exceptional basis.

==== South Korea ====
In South Korea, the Ministry of Science and ICT has public notices. 신고하지 아니하고 개설할 수 있는 무선국용 무선설비의 기술기준, Technical standard for radio equipment for radio stations that can be opened without reporting. They allowed 160 MHz channel bandwidth from 2018 to 2016–27.

==== China ====
China MIIT expanded allowed channels as of 31 December 2012 to add UNII-1, 5150–5250 MHz, UNII-2, 5250–5350 MHz (DFS/TPC), similar to European standards EN 301.893 V1.7.1. China MIIT expanded allowed channels as of 3 July 2017 to add U-NII-3, 5725–5850 MHz.

==== Indonesia ====
Indonesia allows use of the band 5150–5350 MHz with maximum EIRP of 200 mW (23 dBm) and maximum bandwidth of 160 MHz, and the band 5725–5825 MHz with the same maximum EIRP and maximum bandwidth of 80 MHz for indoor use. Outdoors, use of the band 5725–5825 MHz with maximum EIRP of 4 W (36 dBm) is allowed, with a maximum bandwidth of 20 MHz.

==== India ====
In exercise of powers conferred by the Indian Telegraph Act, 1885 and Indian Wireless Telegraphy Act, 1933, the Government of India made the Use of Wireless Access System including Radio Local Area Network in 5 GHz band (Exemption from Licensing Requirement) Rules, 2018.

These rules exempted the spectrum of 5150–5250 MHz, 5250–5350 MHz, and 5725–5875 MHz in the 5 GHz band from licensing, allowing their use for establishing wireless access systems in both indoor and outdoor environments. For transmitters operating in the 5150–5250 MHz, 5250–5350 MHz, and 5470–5725 MHz bands, out-of-band emissions were limited to an e.i.r.p. of −27 dBm/MHz. For transmitters operating in the 5725–5875 MHz band, emissions within 10 MHz of the band edge were limited to an e.i.r.p. of −17 dBm/MHz, while anything beyond this range was limited to −27 dBm/MHz. Additionally, it defined procedures for interference and specified the standards to be followed by wireless equipment.

== 5.9 GHz (802.11p) ==
The 802.11p amendment published on 15 July 2010, specifies WLAN in the licensed band of 5.9 GHz (5.850–5.925 GHz).

Channel	Center frequency (MHz)	Frequency range (MHz)	10 MHz	20 MHz	Band name	United States	United Kingdom	Europe	Japan
172	5860	5855–5865	10	—N/a	DSRC	Unknown		Yes	Unknown
174	5870	5865–5875	10	—N/a	DSRC	Unknown		Yes	Unknown
176	5880	5875–5885	10	—N/a	DSRC	Unknown		Yes	Unknown
178	5890	5885–5895	10	—N/a	DSRC	Unknown		Yes	Unknown
180	5900	5895–5905	10	—N/a	DSRC	Unknown		Yes	Unknown
182	5910	5905–5915	10		C-V2X	No	No	No	Registration required
183 (proposed)	5915	5905–5925		20	C-V2X	No	No	No	Registration required
184	5920	5915–5925	10		C-V2X	No	Indoors/SRD (250 mW)	No	Registration required
187	5935	5930–5940	10		—N/a	No	Indoors/SRD (250 mW)	No	Registration required
188	5940	5930–5950		20	—N/a	No	Indoors/SRD (250 mW)	No	Registration required
189	5945	5940–5950	10		—N/a	No	Indoors/SRD (250 mW)	No	Registration required
192	5960	5950–5970		20	—N/a	No	Indoors/SRD (250 mW)	No	Registration required
196	5980	5970–5990		20	—N/a	No	Indoors/SRD (250 mW)	No	Registration required

== 6 GHz (802.11ax/be/bn) ==
The Wi-Fi Alliance has introduced the term Wi‑Fi 6E to identify and certify IEEE 802.11ax devices that support this new band, which is also used by Wi-Fi 7 (IEEE 802.11be) and Wi-Fi 8 (IEEE 802.11bn).

Ch. 20 MHz	F_{0} (MHz)	Frequency range (MHz)	Center Frequency Index					United States FCC U-NII band(s)	United States	Canada	Australia	Europe, Japan, Russia, New Zealand, Indonesia, Vietnam, Taiwan, India	Greenland, United Arab Emirates, United Kingdom, Mexico	Brazil, Chile, Costa Rica, Guatemala, Honduras, Peru, Saudi Arabia, South Korea	Colombia, Jordan, Qatar	Singapore, Hong Kong, Macao, Philippines
Ch. 20 MHz	F_{0} (MHz)	Frequency range (MHz)	40 MHz	80 MHz	160 MHz	320 MHz		United States FCC U-NII band(s)	United States	Canada	Australia	Europe, Japan, Russia, New Zealand, Indonesia, Vietnam, Taiwan, India	Greenland, United Arab Emirates, United Kingdom, Mexico	Brazil, Chile, Costa Rica, Guatemala, Honduras, Peru, Saudi Arabia, South Korea	Colombia, Jordan, Qatar	Singapore, Hong Kong, Macao, Philippines
2 ^{note}	5935	5925–5945	—N/a					U-NII-5	Standard /LPI	Standard /LPI/VLP	LPI/VLP	LPI/VLP	Yes	Yes	Proposed	Yes
1	5955	5945–5965	3	7	15	31	No	U-NII-5	Standard /LPI	Standard /LPI/VLP	LPI/VLP	LPI/VLP	Yes	Yes	Proposed	Yes
5	5975	5965–5985	3	7	15	31	No	U-NII-5	Standard /LPI	Standard /LPI/VLP	LPI/VLP	LPI/VLP	Yes	Yes	Proposed	Yes
9	5995	5985–6005	11	7	15	31	No	U-NII-5	Standard /LPI	Standard /LPI/VLP	LPI/VLP	LPI/VLP	Yes	Yes	Proposed	Yes
13	6015	6005–6025	11	7	15	31	No	U-NII-5	Standard /LPI	Standard /LPI/VLP	LPI/VLP	LPI/VLP	Yes	Yes	Proposed	Yes
17	6035	6025–6045	19	23	15	31	No	U-NII-5	Standard /LPI	Standard /LPI/VLP	LPI/VLP	LPI/VLP	Yes	Yes	Proposed	Yes
21	6055	6045–6065	19	23	15	31	No	U-NII-5	Standard /LPI	Standard /LPI/VLP	LPI/VLP	LPI/VLP	Yes	Yes	Proposed	Yes
25	6075	6065–6085	27	23	15	31	No	U-NII-5	Standard /LPI	Standard /LPI/VLP	LPI/VLP	LPI/VLP	Yes	Yes	Proposed	Yes
29	6095	6085–6105	27	23	15	31	No	U-NII-5	Standard /LPI	Standard /LPI/VLP	LPI/VLP	LPI/VLP	Yes	Yes	Proposed	Yes
33	6115	6105–6125	35	39	47	31	63	U-NII-5	Standard /LPI	Standard /LPI/VLP	LPI/VLP	LPI/VLP	Yes	Yes	Proposed	Yes
37	6135	6125–6145	35	39	47	31	63	U-NII-5	Standard /LPI	Standard /LPI/VLP	LPI/VLP	LPI/VLP	Yes	Yes	Proposed	Yes
41	6155	6145–6165	43	39	47	31	63	U-NII-5	Standard /LPI	Standard /LPI/VLP	LPI/VLP	LPI/VLP	Yes	Yes	Proposed	Yes
45	6175	6165–6185	43	39	47	31	63	U-NII-5	Standard /LPI	Standard /LPI/VLP	LPI/VLP	LPI/VLP	Yes	Yes	Proposed	Yes
49	6195	6185–6205	51	55	47	31	63	U-NII-5	Standard /LPI	Standard /LPI/VLP	LPI/VLP	LPI/VLP	Yes	Yes	Proposed	Yes
53	6215	6205–6225	51	55	47	31	63	U-NII-5	Standard /LPI	Standard /LPI/VLP	LPI/VLP	LPI/VLP	Yes	Yes	Proposed	Yes
57	6235	6225–6245	59	55	47	31	63	U-NII-5	Standard /LPI	Standard /LPI/VLP	LPI/VLP	LPI/VLP	Yes	Yes	Proposed	Yes
61	6255	6245–6265	59	55	47	31	63	U-NII-5	Standard /LPI	Standard /LPI/VLP	LPI/VLP	LPI/VLP	Yes	Yes	Proposed	Yes
65	6275	6265–6285	67	71	79	95	63	U-NII-5	Standard /LPI	Standard /LPI/VLP	LPI/VLP	LPI/VLP	Yes	Yes	Proposed	Yes
69	6295	6285–6305	67	71	79	95	63	U-NII-5	Standard /LPI	Standard /LPI/VLP	LPI/VLP	LPI/VLP	Yes	Yes	Proposed	Yes
73	6315	6305–6325	75	71	79	95	63	U-NII-5	Standard /LPI	Standard /LPI/VLP	LPI/VLP	LPI/VLP	Yes	Yes	Proposed	Yes
77	6335	6325–6345	75	71	79	95	63	U-NII-5	Standard /LPI	Standard /LPI/VLP	LPI/VLP	LPI/VLP	Yes	Yes	Proposed	Yes
81	6355	6345–6365	83	87	79	95	63	U-NII-5	Standard /LPI	Standard /LPI/VLP	LPI/VLP	LPI/VLP	Yes	Yes	Proposed	Yes
85	6375	6365–6385	83	87	79	95	63	U-NII-5	Standard /LPI	Standard /LPI/VLP	LPI/VLP	LPI/VLP	Yes	Yes	Proposed	Yes
89	6395	6385–6405	91	87	79	95	63	U-NII-5	Standard /LPI	Standard /LPI/VLP	LPI/VLP	LPI/VLP	Yes	Yes	Proposed	Yes
93	6415	6405–6425	91	87	79	95	63	U-NII-5	Standard /LPI	Standard /LPI/VLP	LPI/VLP	LPI/VLP	Yes	Yes	Proposed	Yes
97	6435	6425–6445	99	103	111	95	127	U-NII-6	LPI	Standard /LPI/VLP	LPI/VLP	No	No	Yes	Proposed	No
101	6455	6445–6465	99	103	111	95	127	U-NII-6	LPI	Standard /LPI/VLP	LPI/VLP	No	No	Yes	Proposed	No
105	6475	6465–6485	107	103	111	95	127	U-NII-6	LPI	Standard /LPI/VLP	LPI/VLP	No	No	Yes	Proposed	No
109	6495	6485–6505	107	103	111	95	127	U-NII-6	LPI	Standard /LPI/VLP	LPI/VLP	No	No	Yes	Proposed	No
113	6515	6505–6525	115	119	111	95	127	U-NII-6	LPI	Standard /LPI/VLP	LPI/VLP	No	No	Yes	Proposed	No
117	6535	6525–6545	115	119	111	95	127	U-NII-7	Standard /LPI	Standard /LPI/VLP	LPI/VLP	No	No	Yes	Proposed	No
121	6555	6545–6565	123	119	111	95	127	U-NII-7	Standard /LPI	Standard /LPI/VLP	LPI/VLP	No	No	Yes	Proposed	No
125	6575	6565–6585	123	119	111	95	127	U-NII-7	Standard /LPI	Standard /LPI/VLP	LPI/VLP	No	No	Yes	Proposed	No
129	6595	6585–6605	131	135	143	159	127	U-NII-7	Standard /LPI	Standard /LPI/VLP		No	No	Yes	Proposed	No
133	6615	6605–6625	131	135	143	159	127	U-NII-7	Standard /LPI	Standard /LPI/VLP		No	No	Yes	Proposed	No
137	6635	6625–6645	139	135	143	159	127	U-NII-7	Standard /LPI	Standard /LPI/VLP		No	No	Yes	Proposed	No
141	6655	6645–6665	139	135	143	159	127	U-NII-7	Standard /LPI	Standard /LPI/VLP		No	No	Yes	Proposed	No
145	6675	6665–6685	147	151	143	159	127	U-NII-7	Standard /LPI	Standard /LPI/VLP		No	No	Yes	Proposed	No
149	6695	6685–6705	147	151	143	159	127	U-NII-7	Standard /LPI	Standard /LPI/VLP		No	No	Yes	Proposed	No
153	6715	6705–6725	155	151	143	159	127	U-NII-7	Standard /LPI	Standard /LPI/VLP		No	No	Yes	Proposed	No
157	6735	6725–6745	155	151	143	159	127	U-NII-7	Standard /LPI	Standard /LPI/VLP		No	No	Yes	Proposed	No
161	6755	6745–6765	163	167	175	159	191	U-NII-7	Standard /LPI	Standard /LPI/VLP		No	No	Yes	Proposed	No
165	6775	6765–6785	163	167	175	159	191	U-NII-7	Standard /LPI	Standard /LPI/VLP		No	No	Yes	Proposed	No
169	6795	6785–6805	171	167	175	159	191	U-NII-7	Standard /LPI	Standard /LPI/VLP		No	No	Yes	Proposed	No
173	6815	6805–6825	171	167	175	159	191	U-NII-7	Standard /LPI	Standard /LPI/VLP		No	No	Yes	Proposed	No
177	6835	6825–6845	179	183	175	159	191	U-NII-7	Standard /LPI	Standard /LPI/VLP		No	No	Yes	Proposed	No
181	6855	6845–6865	179	183	175	159	191	U-NII-7	Standard /LPI	Standard /LPI/VLP		No	No	Yes	Proposed	No
185	6875	6865–6885	187	183	175	159	191	U-NII-7/8	LPI	LPI/VLP		No	No	Yes	Proposed	No
189	6895	6885–6905	187	183	175	159	191	U-NII-8	LPI	LPI/VLP		No	No	Yes	Proposed	No
193	6915	6905–6925	195	199	207	No	191	U-NII-8	LPI	LPI/VLP		No	No	Yes	Proposed	No
197	6935	6925–6945	195	199	207	No	191	U-NII-8	LPI	LPI/VLP		No	No	Yes	Proposed	No
201	6955	6945–6965	203	199	207	No	191	U-NII-8	LPI	LPI/VLP		No	No	Yes	Proposed	No
205	6975	6965–6985	203	199	207	No	191	U-NII-8	LPI	LPI/VLP		No	No	Yes	Proposed	No
209	6995	6985–7005	211	215	207	No	191	U-NII-8	LPI	LPI/VLP		No	No	Yes	Proposed	No
213	7015	7005–7025	211	215	207	No	191	U-NII-8	LPI	LPI/VLP		No	No	Yes	Proposed	No
217	7035	7025–7045	219	215	207	No	191	U-NII-8	LPI	LPI/VLP		No	No	Yes	Proposed	No
221	7055	7045–7065	219	215	207	No	191	U-NII-8	LPI	LPI/VLP		No	No	Yes	Proposed	No
225	7075	7065–7085	227	No	No	No	No	U-NII-8	LPI	LPI/VLP		No	No	Yes	Proposed	No
229	7095	7085–7105	227	No	No	No	No	U-NII-8	LPI	LPI/VLP		No	No	Yes	Proposed	No
233	7115	7105–7125	No	No	No	No	No	U-NII-8	LPI	LPI/VLP		No	No	Yes	Proposed	No
Ch.	F_{0} (MHz)	Frequency range (MHz)	40 MHz	80 MHz	160 MHz	320 MHz		United States FCC U-NII band(s)	United States	Canada	Australia	Europe, Japan, Russia, New Zealand, Indonesia, Vietnam, India	Greenland, United Arab Emirates, United Kingdom, Mexico	Brazil, Chile, Costa Rica, Guatemala, Honduras, Peru, Saudi Arabia, South Korea	Colombia, Jordan, Qatar	Singapore, Hong Kong, Macao, Philippines

=== Notes ===
- ↑ Channel 2: The 802.11ax specification defines a special Operating Class 136 starting at 5925Mhz at 20Mhz wide containing channel 2. Not all regions reserved frequencies this low for 6Ghz. European regulations allow the first channel to begin at 5945Mhz. Others such as New Zealand, India begin at 5925 MHz. Thus, the separate operating class was created to allow flexibility for any regions (where regulations allow) to make use of channel 2, however the industry considers this channel as a reserved guard band to ensure there is no possibility of overlap with the 5Ghz band or other adjacent spectrum reservations.

Initialisms (precise definition below):

- LPI: low-power indoor
- VLP: very-low-power

=== United States ===
On 23 April 2020, the FCC voted on and ratified a Report and Order<reweb|url=https://www.fcc.gov/documennd-other-unlicensed-uses/|title=FCC Opens 6 GHz Band to WiUses|website=fcc.gov|date=23 April 2020 }}</ref> to allocate 1.2 GHz of unlicensed spectrum in the 6 GHz band (5.925–7.125 GHz) for Wi-Fi use.

==== Standard power ====
USA 6 GHz standard-power channels
Band	20 MHz	40 MHz	80 MHz	160 MHz	320 MHz
U-NII-5	24	12	6	3	1
U-NII-6	Not allowed				
U-NII-7	17	8	3	1	0
U-NII-8	Not allowed				
Total	41	20	9	4	1

Standard-power access points are permitted indoors and outdoors at a maximum EIRP of 36 dBm in the U-NII-5 and U-NII-7 sub-bands with automatic frequency coordination (AFC).

==== Low-power indoor (LPI) operation ====
USA 6 GHz low-power indoor channels
Band	20 MHz	40 MHz	80 MHz	160 MHz	320 MHz
U-NII-5	24	12	6	3	1.5
U-NII-6	5	2.5	1.25	0.5	0.25
U-NII-7	17.5	8.75	4.25	2.25	1.125
U-NII-8	12.5	5.75	2.5	1.25	0.125
Total	59	29	14	7	3

Note: Partial channels indicate channels that span UNII boundaries, which is permitted in 6 GHz LPI operation. Under the proposed channel numbers, the U-NII-7/U-NII-8 boundary is spanned by channels 185 (20 MHz), 187 (40 MHz), 183 (80 MHz), and 175 (160 MHz). The U-NII-6/U-NII-7 boundary is spanned by channels 115 (40 MHz), 119 (80 MHz), and channel 111 (160 MHz).

For use in indoor environments, access points are limited to a maximum EIRP of 30 dBm and a maximum power spectral density of 5 dBm/MHz. They can operate in this mode on all four U-NII bands (5,6,7,8) without the use of automatic frequency coordination. To help ensure they are used only indoors, these types of access points are not permitted to be connectorized for external antennas, weather-resistant, or run on battery power.

==== Very-low-power devices ====
The FCC may issue a ruling in the future on a third class of very low power devices such as hotspots and short-range applications.

=== Canada ===
In November 2020, the Innovation, Science and Economic Development (ISED) of Canada published "Consultation on the Technical and Policy Framework for Licence-Exempt Use in the 6 GHz Band". They proposed to allow licence-exempt operations in the 6 GHz spectrum for three classes of radio local area networks (RLANs):

==== Standard power ====
For indoor and outdoor use. Maximum EIRP of 36 dBm and maximum power spectral density (PSD) of 23 dBm/MHz. Should employ Automated Frequency Coordination (AFC) control.

==== Low-power indoor (LPI) ====
For indoor use only. Maximum EIRP of 30 dBm and maximum PSD of 5 dBm/MHz.

==== Very-low-power (VLP) ====
For indoor and outdoor use. Maximum EIRP of 14 dBm and maximum PSD of -5 dBm/MHz. (-8 dBm/MHz was in consultation, -5 dBm/MHz was finalized)

=== Europe ===
ECC Decision (20)01 from 20 November 2020 allocated the frequency band from 5945 to 6425 MHz (corresponding almost to the US U-NII-5 band) for use by low-power indoor and very-low-power devices for Wireless Access Systems/Radio Local Area Networks (WAS/RLAN), with a portion specifically reserved for rail networks and intelligent transport systems.

EU 6 GHz channels
Band	20 MHz	40 MHz	80 MHz	160 MHz
5945–6425 MHz	24	12	6	3

=== India ===
On January 20, 2026, the Ministry of Communications, Government of India, through a Gazette notification, has officially de-licensed the lower portion of the 6 GHz spectrum (from 5925 MHz to 6425 MHz) for the Use of Low Power and Very Low Power Wireless Access System.

India 6 GHz channels
Band	20 MHz	40 MHz	80 MHz	160 MHz	320 MHz
5925–6425 MHz	24	12	6	3	1

==== Low-power indoor (LPI) ====
For indoor use only. Maximum EIRP of 30 dBm and maximum PSD of 11 dBm/MHz.

==== Very-low-power outdoor (VLP) ====
For indoor and outdoor use. Maximum EIRP of 14 dBm and maximum PSD of 1 dBm/MHz.

=== United Kingdom ===
Since July 2020, the UK's Ofcom permitted unlicensed use of the lower 6 GHz band (5945 to 6425 MHz, corresponding to the US U-NII-5 band) by Low Power indoor (max 250 mW and 12.6mW/MHz EIRP) and Very Low Power indoor and mobile Outdoor device.

=== Australia ===
In April 2021, Australia's ACMA opened consultations for the 6 GHz band. The lower 6 GHz band (5925 to 6425 MHz, corresponding to the US U-NII-5 band) was approved for 250 mW EIRP indoors and 25 mW outdoors on March 4, 2022. From 1 October 2025 the approved range was increased by 160 MHz to 5925–6585 MHz, allowing for an additional 160 MHz / 320 MHz channel in the 6 GHz band for Wi-Fi use. The ACMA intends to allocate the 6585–7100 MHz portion of the band to mobile telephony use, but is delaying that allocation while it monitors spectrum arrangements in other major markets that drive the manufacturing of mobile network equipment, potentially allowing for additional spectrum to be allocated to Wi-Fi at a later date.

This is in line with the following ACMA decisions on the future of the upper 6 GHz spectrum in Australia published in the December 2024 consultation outcomes paper:

• Add 6425–6585 MHz to the LIPD class licence to support RLAN (Radio Local Area Network) use. This work is intended to be implemented as part of our task to remake the instrument prior to its sunsetting in October 2025. We are aiming to consult on updates to the LIPD class licence in early 2025.

• Plan for 6585–7100 MHz in defined population areas for potential WA WBB (Wide Area Wireless Broadband) use, but not commence implementation of these arrangements until certainty around progress towards international equipment markets can be provided. This planning will include determination of defined areas in consultation with stakeholders.

• Once defined areas have been determined, make provision for apparatus licensed access in 6585–7100 MHz outside those areas to enable the deployment of local area WBB services (either IMT or RLAN-based technologies).''

==== Low-power indoor (LPI) ====
For indoor use only. Maximum EIRP of 250 mW. The power spectral density must not be greater than 12.5 mW EIRP per 1 MHz.

==== Very-low-power (VLP) ====
For indoor and outdoor use. Maximum EIRP of 25 mW. The power spectral density must not be greater than 1.25 mW EIRP per 1 MHz.

Australia 6 GHz Channels
Band	20 MHz	40 MHz	80 MHz	160 MHz	320 MHz
5945–6585 MHz	32	16	8	4	2

=== Japan ===
In September 2022, the Ministry of Internal Affairs and Communications announced amendments to the ministerial order and notices related to the Radio Act.

==== Low-power indoor (LPI) ====
For indoor use only. Maximum EIRP of 200 mW.

==== Very-low-power (VLP) ====
For indoor and outdoor use. Maximum EIRP of 25 mW.

=== Taiwan ===
Since August 2023, Taiwan's NCC permitted unlicensed use of the lower 6 GHz band (5945 to 6425 MHz, corresponding to the US U-NII-5 band) by Low Power indoor and Very Low Power indoor and mobile Outdoor device.

=== Russia ===
In December 2022, Russian State Commission for Radio Frequencies authorised 6 GHz operation for low-power indoor (LPI) use with transmitter power control (TPC) limited to maximum EIRP of 200 mW and maximum PSD of 10 mW/MHz, and very low power (VLP) indoor and mobile outdoor use with maximum EIRP of 25 mW and maximum PSD of 1.3 mW/MHz.

=== Singapore ===
In May 2023, Singapore's IMDA will amend its Regulations to allocate the radio frequency spectrum 5,925 MHz – 6,425 MHz for Wi-Fi use in Singapore.

=== Philippines ===
On May 23, 2024, the Philippines' National Telecommunications Commission (NTC) is considering the use of 5925 MHz to 6425 MHz frequency bands indoors with an effective radiated power (ERP) not exceeding 250 mW and outdoors with an effective radiated power not exceeding 25 mW. On July 5, 2024, the NTC has released Memorandum Circular No. 002-07-2024, allowing 6 GHz Wi-Fi use, with the added restriction that the use on unmanned aircraft systems is prohibited.

== 45 GHz (802.11aj) ==
The 802.11aj standards, also known as WiGig, operate in the 45 GHz spectrum.

45 GHz WiGig channels
Channel	Frequency (GHz)				Channel	Frequency (GHz)			
Channel	Center	Min.	Max.	BW	Channel	Center	Min.	Max.	BW
1	42.66	42.39	42.93	0.54	11	42.93	42.39	43.47	1.08
2	43.20	42.93	43.47	0.54	11	42.93	42.39	43.47	1.08
3	43.74	43.47	44.01	0.54	12	44.01	43.47	44.55	1.08
4	44.28	44.01	44.55	0.54	12	44.01	43.47	44.55	1.08
5	44.82	44.55	45.09	0.54	13	45.09	44.55	45.63	1.08
6	45.36	45.09	45.63	0.54	13	45.09	44.55	45.63	1.08
7	45.90	45.63	46.17	0.54	14	46.17	45.63	46.71	1.08
8	46.44	46.17	46.71	0.54	14	46.17	45.63	46.71	1.08
9	47.52	47.25	47.79	0.54	15	47.79	47.25	48.33	1.08
10	48.06	47.79	48.33	0.54	15	47.79	47.25	48.33	1.08

== 60 GHz (802.11ad/aj/ay) ==
The 802.11ad/aj/ay standards, also known as WiGig, operate in the 60 GHz V band unlicensed ISM band spectrum.

60 GHz WiGig channels
Channel 2.16 GHz	Frequency (GHz)			Channel 4.32 GHz		Channel 6.48 GHz			Channel 8.64 GHz				Channel 1.08 GHz	Frequency (GHz)		
Channel 2.16 GHz	Center	Min.	Max.	Channel 4.32 GHz		Channel 6.48 GHz			Channel 8.64 GHz				Channel 1.08 GHz	Center	Min.	Max.
1	58.32	57.24	59.40	9	—N/a	17	—N/a	—N/a	25	—N/a	—N/a	—N/a	33	57.78	57.24	58.32
2	60.48	59.40	61.56	9	10	17	18	—N/a	25	26	—N/a	—N/a	34	58.86	58.32	59.40
3	62.64	61.56	63.72	11	10	17	18	19	25	26	27	—N/a	35	59.94	59.40	60.48
4	64.80	63.72	65.88	11	12	20	18	19	25	26	27	28	36	61.02	60.48	61.56
5	66.96	65.88	68.04	13	12	20	21	19	29	26	27	28	37	62.10	61.56	62.64
6	69.12	68.04	70.20	13	14	20	21	22	29	—N/a	27	28	38	63.18	62.64	63.72
7	71.28	70.20	72.36	15	14	—N/a	21	22	29	—N/a	—N/a	28	39	64.26	63.72	64.80
8	73.44	72.36	74.52	15	—N/a	—N/a	—N/a	22	29	—N/a	—N/a	—N/a	40	65.34	64.80	65.88

=== Indonesia ===
Indonesia allows the use of the band 57–64 GHz with maximum EIRP of 10 W (40 dBm), and maximum bandwidth of 2.16 GHz, for indoor use.

== See also ==
- 2.4 GHz radio use
- High-speed multimedia radio
- IEEE 802.11 § Layer 2 – Datagrams
