= Unlicensed National Information Infrastructure =

Radio frequency allotment

The Unlicensed National Information Infrastructure (U-NII) radio band, as defined by the United States Federal Communications Commission, is part of the radio frequency spectrum used by WLAN devices and by many wireless ISPs.

As of March 2021, U-NII consists of eight ranges. U-NII 1 through 4 are for 5 GHz WLAN (802.11a and newer), and 5 through 8 are for 6 GHz WLAN (802.11ax) use. U-NII 2 is further divided into three subsections.

U-NII bands and FCC regs
Name	Aliases	Freq. Range (GHz)	Bandwidth (MHz)	Max Power (mW)	Max EIRP (mW)
U-NII-1	U-NII Low / U-NII Indoor	5.150–5.250	100	50	200
U-NII-2A	U-NII Mid	5.250–5.350	100	250	1,000
U-NII-2B		5.350–5.470	120	—	—
U-NII-2C	U-NII Worldwide / U-NII-2-Extended / U-NII-2e	5.470–5.725	255	250	1,000
U-NII-3	U-NII Upper	5.725-5.850	125	1,000	4,000
U-NII-4	DSRC/ITS	5.850–5.925	75	—	—
U-NII-5		5.925–6.425	500	—	—
U-NII-6		6.425–6.525	100	—	—
U-NII-7		6.525–6.875	350	—	—
U-NII-8		6.875–7.125	250	—	—

Wireless ISPs generally use 5.725–5.825 GHz.
In the USA licensed amateur radio operators are authorized 5.650–5.925 GHz by Part 97.303 of the FCC rules.

U-NII power limits are defined by the United States CFR Title 47 (Telecommunication), Part 15 - Radio Frequency Devices, Subpart E - Unlicensed National Information Infrastructure Devices, Paragraph 15.407 - General technical requirements.

Many other countries use similar bands for Wireless communication due to a shared IEEE standard. However, regulatory use in individual countries may differ.

The defunct European HiperLAN standard operates in same frequency band as the U-NII.

== 5 GHz (802.11a/h/j/n/ac/ax) ==
Except where noted, all information taken from Annex J of IEEE 802.11-2007 modified by amendments k, y and n. Because countries set their own regulations regarding specific uses and maximum power levels within these frequency ranges, it is recommended that local authorities are consulted as regulations may change at any time.

It operates over four ranges:

- U-NII Low (U-NII-1): 5.150–5.250 GHz. Originally limited to indoor use only. Regulations required use of an integrated antenna, with power limited to 50 mW. Rules changed in 2014 to permit outdoor operation, maximum fixed power 1 watt, maximum fixed EIRP 4 watts (+36 dBm) point-to-multipoint, 200 watts (+53 dBm) point-to-point. However, strict out-of-band emission rules limit practical point-to-point power to lower levels.
- U-NII Mid (U-NII-2A): 5.250–5.350 GHz. Both outdoor and indoor use, subject to Dynamic Frequency Selection (DFS, or radar avoidance). Regulations allow for a user-installable antenna. Power limited to 250 mW.
- U-NII-2B: 5.350–5.470 GHz. Currently 120 MHz of spectrum not allocated by the FCC for unlicensed use.
- U-NII Worldwide (U-NII-2C / U-NII-2e): 5.470–5.725 GHz. Both outdoor and indoor use, subject to Dynamic Frequency Selection (DFS, or radar avoidance). Power limited to 250 mW. This spectrum was added by the FCC in 2003 to "align the frequency bands used by U-NII devices in the United States with bands in other parts of the world". The FCC currently has an interim limitation on operations on channels which overlap the 5600–5650 MHz band.
- U-NII Upper (U-NII-3): 5.725–5.850 GHz. Sometimes referred to as U-NII / ISM due to overlap with the ISM band. Regulations allow for a user-installable antenna. Power limited to 1W in the United States and 25mW in European Union.
- DSRC/ITS (U-NII-4): 5.850–5.925 GHz. At present U-NII-4 spectrum is being considered by the FCC for unlicensed use. U-NII-4 is presently only usable for Dedicated Short Range Communications Service (DSRC) and licensed amateur radio operators.

In 2007, the FCC began requiring that devices operating in channels 52, 56, 60 and 64 must have Dynamic Frequency Selection (DFS) capabilities. This is to avoid communicating in the same frequency range as some radar. In 2014, the FCC issued new rules for all devices due to interference with government weather radar systems. Fines and equipment seizure were listed as punishment for non-compliance.

Band	Channel	Frequency (MHz)	United States	Europe	Japan		Singapore	China	Israel	Korea	Turkey	India		United Kingdom
Band	Channel	Frequency (MHz)	40/20 MHz	40/20 MHz	40/20 MHz	10 MHz	20 MHz	20 MHz	20 MHz	20 MHz	20 MHz	40/20 MHz	5/10 MHz	80/40/20 MHz
	183	4915	No	No	No	Yes	No	No	No	No	No	No	Yes	No
	184	4920	No	No	Yes	Yes	No	No	No	No	No	Yes	Yes	No
	185	4925	No	No	No	Yes	No	No	No	No	No	No	Yes	No
	187	4935	No	No	No	Yes	No	No	No	No	No	No	Yes	No
	188	4940	No	No	Yes	Yes	No	No	No	No	No	Yes	Yes	No
	189	4945	No	No	No	Yes	No	No	No	No	No	No	Yes	No
	192	4960	No	No	Yes	No	No	No	No	No	No	Yes	Yes	No
	196	4980	No	No	Yes	No	No	No	No	No	No	Yes	Yes	No
	7	5035	No	No	No	Yes	No	No	No	No	No	No	No	No
	8	5040	No	No	No	Yes	No	No	No	No	No	No	No	No
	9	5045	No	No	No	Yes	No	No	No	No	No	No	No	No
	11	5055	No	No	No	Yes	No	No	No	No	No	No	No	No
	12	5060	No	No	No	No	No	No	No	No	No	No	No	No
	16	5080	No	No	No	No	No	No	No	No	No	No	No	No
U-NII-1	34	5170	No	No	No	No	No	No	Yes	Yes	Yes	Yes	Yes	No
U-NII-1	36	5180	Yes	Yes	Yes	No	Yes	No	Yes	Yes	Yes	Yes	Yes	Yes
U-NII-1	38	5190	No	No	No	No	No	No	Yes	Yes	Yes	Yes	Yes	No
U-NII-1	40	5200	Yes	Yes	Yes	No	Yes	No	Yes	Yes	Yes	Yes	Yes	Yes
U-NII-1	42	5210	No	No	No	No	No	No	Yes	Yes	Yes	Yes	Yes	No
U-NII-1	44	5220	Yes	Yes	Yes	No	Yes	No	Yes	Yes	Yes	Yes	Yes	Yes
U-NII-1	46	5230	No	No	No	No	No	No	Yes	Yes	Yes	Yes	Yes	No
U-NII-1	48	5240	Yes	Yes	Yes	No	No	No	Yes	Yes	Yes	Yes	Yes	Yes
U-NII-2A	52	5260	Yes	Yes	Yes	No	No	No	Yes	No	No	No	No	Yes
U-NII-2A	56	5280	Yes	Yes	Yes	No	No	No	Yes	Yes	Yes	Yes	Yes	Yes
U-NII-2A	60	5300	Yes	Yes	Yes	No	No	No	Yes	Yes	Yes	Yes	Yes	Yes
U-NII-2A	64	5320	Yes	Yes	Yes	No	No	No	Yes	Yes	Yes	Yes	Yes	Yes
U-NII-2B		5350–5470	No	Unknown										No
U-NII-2C	100	5500	Yes	Yes	Yes	No	No	No	No	Yes	No	Yes	Yes	Yes
U-NII-2C	104	5520	Yes	Yes	Yes	No	No	No	No	Yes	No	Yes	Yes	Yes
U-NII-2C	108	5540	Yes	Yes	Yes	No	No	No	No	Yes	No	Yes	Yes	Yes
U-NII-2C	112	5560	Yes	Yes	Yes	No	No	No	No	Yes	No	Yes	Yes	Yes
U-NII-2C	116	5580	Yes	Yes	Yes	No	No	No	No	Yes	No	Yes	Yes	Yes
U-NII-2C	120	5600	No	Yes	Yes	No	No	No	No	Yes	No	Yes	Yes	Yes
U-NII-2C	124	5620	No	Yes	Yes	No	No	No	No	Yes	No	Yes	Yes	Yes
U-NII-2C	128	5640	No	Yes	Yes	No	No	No	No	Yes	No	Yes	Yes	Yes
U-NII-2C	132	5660	Yes	Yes	Yes	No	No	No	No	No	No	No	Yes	Yes
U-NII-2C	136	5680	Yes	Yes	Yes	No	No	No	No	No	No	Yes	Yes	Yes
U-NII-2C	140	5700	Yes	Yes	Yes	No	No	No	No	No	No	No	Yes	Yes
U-NII-3	149	5745	Yes	Yes	No	No	Yes	Yes	No	Yes	Yes	Yes	Yes	Yes
U-NII-3	153	5765	Yes	Yes	No	No	Yes	Yes	No	Yes	Yes	Yes	Yes	Yes
U-NII-3	157	5785	Yes	Yes	No	No	Yes	Yes	No	Yes	Yes	Yes	Yes	Yes
U-NII-3	161	5805	Yes	Yes	No	No	Yes	Yes	No	Yes	Yes	Yes	Yes	Yes
U-NII-3	165	5825	Yes	Yes	No	No	Yes	Yes	No	Yes	Yes	Yes	Yes	Yes
U-NII-4	169	5845	No	Unknown								No	Yes	No
U-NII-4	173	5865	No	Unknown								No	Yes	No
U-NII-4	177	5885	No	Unknown								No	Yes	No
U-NII-4	181	5905	No	Unknown								No	Yes	No
U-NII-4	185	5925 (proposed expansion)	No	Unknown								No	Yes	No
Band	Channel	Frequency (MHz)	40/20 MHz	40/20 MHz	40/20 MHz	10 MHz	20 MHz	20 MHz	20 MHz	20 MHz	20 MHz	40/20 MHz	5/10 MHz	80/40/20 MHz
Band	Channel	Frequency (MHz)	United States	Europe	Japan		Singapore	China	Israel	Korea	Turkey	India		United Kingdom

== See also ==
- List of WLAN channels § 5 GHz (802.11a/h/j/n/ac/ax)
- Part 15 (FCC rules)
- ISM band
- 802.11
