= Cellular traffic =

Telecommunications concept

This article discusses the mobile cellular network aspect of teletraffic measurements. Mobile radio networks have traffic issues that do not arise in connection with the fixed line PSTN. Important aspects of cellular traffic include: quality of service targets, traffic capacity and cell size, spectral efficiency and sectorization, traffic capacity versus coverage, and channel holding time analysis.

Teletraffic engineering in telecommunications network planning ensures that network costs are minimised without compromising the quality of service (QoS) delivered to the user of the network. This field of engineering is based on probability theory and can be used to analyse mobile radio networks, as well as other telecommunications networks.

A mobile handset which is moving in a cell will record a signal strength that varies. Signal strength is subject to slow fading, fast fading and interference from other signals, resulting in degradation of the carrier-to-interference ratio (C/I). A high C/I ratio yields quality communication. A good C/I ratio is achieved in cellular systems by using optimum power levels through the power control of most links. When carrier power is too high, excessive interference is created, degrading the C/I ratio for other traffic and reducing the traffic capacity of the radio subsystem. When carrier power is too low, C/I is too low and QoS targets are not met.

== Quality of Service targets ==
At the time that the cells of a radio subsystem are designed, Quality of Service (QoS) targets are set, for: traffic congestion and blocking, dominant coverage area, C/I, outage probability, handover failure rate, overall call success rate, data rate, delay, etc.

== Traffic load and cell size ==
The more traffic generated, the more base stations will be needed to service the customers. The number of base stations for a simple cellular network is equal to the number of cells. The traffic engineer can achieve the goal of satisfying the increasing population of customers by increasing the number of cells in the area concerned, so this will also increases the number of base stations. This method is called cell splitting (and combined with sectorization) is the only way of providing services to a burgeoning population. This simply works by dividing the cells already present into smaller sizes hence increasing the traffic capacity. Reduction of the cell radius enables the cell to accommodate extra traffic. The cost of equipment can also be cut down by reducing the number of base stations through setting up three neighbouring cells, with the cells serving three 120° sectors with different channel groups.

Mobile radio networks are operated with finite, limited resources (the spectrum of frequencies available). These resources have to be used effectively to ensure that all users receive service, that is, the quality of service is consistently maintained. This need to carefully use the limited spectrum, brought about the development of cells in mobile networks, enabling frequency re-use by successive clusters of cells. Systems that efficiently use the available spectrum have been developed e.g. the GSM system. Bernhard Walke defines spectral efficiency as the traffic capacity unit divided by the product of bandwidth and surface area element, and is dependent on the number of radio channels per cell and the cluster size (number of cells in a group of cells):

$$\mathrm{efficiency}=\frac{N_\mathrm{c}}{\mathrm{BW}\cdot A_\mathrm{c}},$$

where N_{c} is the number of channels per cell, BW is the system bandwidth, and A_{c} is Area of cell.

Sectorization is briefly described in traffic load and cell size as a way to cut down equipment costs in a cellular network. When applied to clusters of cells sectorization also reduces co-channel interference, according to Walke. This is because the power radiated backward from a directional base station antenna is minimal and interfering with adjacent cells is reduced. (The number of channels is directly proportional to the number of cells.) The maximum traffic capacity of sectored antennas (directional) is greater than that of omnidirectional antennas by a factor which is the number of sectors per cell (or cell cluster).

== Traffic capacity versus coverage ==
Cellular systems use one or more of four different techniques of access (TDMA, FDMA, CDMA, SDMA). See Cellular concepts. Let a case of Code Division Multiple Access be considered for the relationship between traffic capacity and coverage (area covered by cells). CDMA cellular systems can allow an increase in traffic capacity at the expense of the quality of service.

In TDMA/FDMA cellular radio systems, Fixed Channel Allocation (FCA) is used to allocate channels to customers. In FCA the number of channels in the cell remains constant irrespective of the number of customers in that cell. This results in traffic congestion and some calls being lost when traffic gets heavy.

A better way of channel allocation in cellular systems is Dynamic Channel Allocation (DCA) which is supported by the GSM, DCS and other systems. DCA is a better way not only for handling bursty cell traffic but also in efficiently using the cellular radio resources. DCA allows the number of channels in a cell to vary with the traffic load, hence increasing channel capacity with little costs. Since a cell is allocated a group of frequency carries (e.g. f_{1}-f_{7}) for each user, this range of frequencies is the bandwidth of that cell, BW. If that cell covers an area A_{c}, and each user has bandwidth B then the number of channels will be BW/B. The density of channels will be $\frac{\mathrm{BW}}{A_\mathrm{c}\cdot\mathrm{B}}$. This formula shows that as the coverage area A_{c} is increased, the channel density decreases.

== Channel holding time ==
Important parameters like the carrier-to-interference ratio (C/I), spectral efficiency and reuse distance determine the quality of service of a cellular network. Channel Holding Time is another parameter that can affect the quality of service in a cellular network, hence it is considered when planning the network. Calculating the channel holding time, however is not easy. (This is the time a Mobile Station (MS) remains in the same cell during a call). Channel holding time is therefore less than call holding time if the MS travels more than one cell as handover will take place and the MS relinquishes the channel. Practically, it is not possible to determine exactly the channel holding time. As a result, different models exist for the channel holding time distribution. In industry, a good approximation of the channel holding time is usually sufficient to determine the network traffic capability.

One of the papers in Key and Smith defines channel holding time as being equal to the average holding time divided by the average number of handovers per call plus one. Usually an exponential model is preferred to calculate the channel holding time for simplicity in simulations. This model gives the distribution function of channel holding time and it is an approximation that can be used to obtain estimates channel holding time. The exponential model may not be correctly modelling the channel holding time distribution as other papers may try to prove, but it gives an approximation. Channel holding time is not easily determined explicitly, call holding time and user's movements have to be determined in order to implicitly give channel holding time. The mobility of the user and the cell shape and size cause the channel holding time to have a different distribution function to that of call duration (call holding time). This difference is large for highly mobile users and small cell sizes. Since the channel holding time and call duration relationships are affected by mobility and cell size, for a stationary MS and large cell sizes, channel holding time and call duration are the same.

== See also ==
- Radio Resource Management
- Base Station Subsystem – GSM radio network
- Cell on wheels
- Cell site
- Network congestion
- Cellular frequencies
  - GSM frequency bands
  - UMTS frequency bands
- Cellular repeater
- Code Division Multiple Access (CDMA)
- Mobile phone
- Multiple-input multiple-output communications (MIMO)
- Professional Mobile Radio (PMR)
- Radio resource management (RRM)
- Signal strength
- Spectral efficiency comparison table
- OpenBTS
- Cellular router
