= Call duration =

In telecommunications, the term call duration has the following meanings:

1. In telephone systems, the time between (a) the instant a circuit, i.e., off-hook condition at each end, is established between the call originator and the call receiver and (b) the instant the call originator or the call receiver terminates the call.
2. In data transmission, the duration of the information transfer phase of an information transfer transaction.

This article incorporates public domain material from Federal Standard 1037C. General Services Administration. Archived from the original on 2022-01-22. (in support of MIL-STD-188).
