= DECT =

ETSI standard for cordless telephony

- Digital enhanced cordless telecommunications
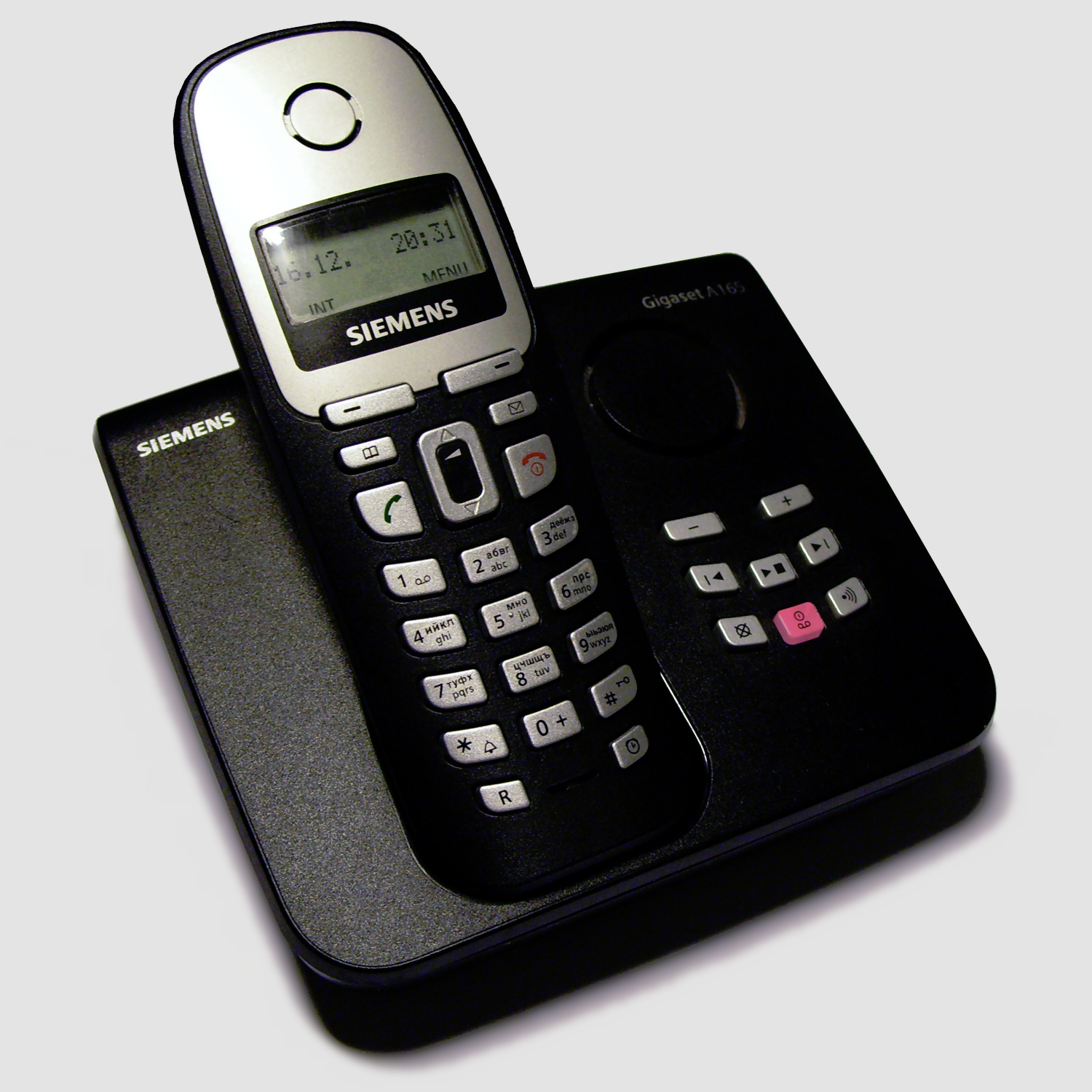
- Gigaset A165 phone with base station. In DECT terminology, the phone is the 'portable part' (PP) and the base station the 'fixed part' (FP).
- Abbreviation: DECT
- Organization: ETSI, DECT Forum
- Predecessor: CT2 (Note: CT3 was only available as prototype and subsequently replaced by DECT)
- Domain: Cordless telephony
- Website: etsi.org/technologies/dect

Digital Enhanced Cordless Telecommunications (DECT) is a cordless telephony standard maintained by ETSI. It originated in Europe, where it is the common standard, replacing earlier standards, such as CT1 and CT2. Since the DECT-2020 standard it also includes IoT communication.

Beyond Europe, it has been adopted by Australia and most countries in Asia and South America. North American adoption was delayed by United States radio-frequency regulations. This forced development of a variation of DECT called DECT 6.0, using a slightly different frequency range, which makes these units incompatible with systems intended for use in other areas, even from the same manufacturer. DECT has almost completely replaced other standards in most countries where it is used, with the exception of North America.

DECT was originally intended for fast roaming between networked base stations, and the first DECT product was Net^{3} wireless LAN. However, its most popular application is single-cell cordless phones connected to traditional analog telephone, primarily in home and small-office systems, though gateways with multi-cell DECT and/or DECT repeaters are also available in many private branch exchange (PBX) systems for medium and large businesses, produced by Panasonic, Mitel, Gigaset, Ascom, Cisco, Grandstream, Snom, Spectralink, and RTX. DECT can also be used for purposes other than cordless phones, such as baby monitors, wireless microphones and industrial sensors. The ULE Alliance's DECT ULE and its "HAN FUN" protocol are variants tailored for home security, automation, and the internet of things (IoT).

The DECT standard includes the generic access profile (GAP), a common interoperability profile for simple telephone capabilities, which most manufacturers implement. GAP-conformance enables DECT handsets and bases from different manufacturers to interoperate at the most basic level of functionality, that of making and receiving calls. Japan uses its own DECT variant, J-DECT, which is supported by the DECT forum.

The New Generation DECT (NG-DECT) standard, marketed as CAT-iq by the DECT Forum, provides a common set of advanced capabilities for handsets and base stations. CAT-iq allows interchangeability across IP-DECT base stations and handsets from different manufacturers, while maintaining backward compatibility with GAP equipment. It also requires mandatory support for wideband audio.

DECT-2020 New Radio, marketed as NR+ (New Radio plus), is a 5G data transmission protocol which meets ITU-R IMT-2020 requirements for ultra-reliable low-latency and massive machine-type communications, and can co-exist with earlier DECT devices.

== Standards history ==
The DECT standard was developed by ETSI in several phases, the first of which took place between 1988 and 1992 when the first round of standards were published. These were the ETS 300–175 series in nine parts defining the air interface, and ETS 300-176 defining how the units should be type approved. A technical report, ETR-178, was also published to explain the standard. Subsequent standards were developed and published by ETSI to cover interoperability profiles and standards for testing.

Named Digital European Cordless Telephone at its launch by CEPT in November 1987; its name was soon changed to Digital European Cordless Telecommunications, following a suggestion by Enrico Tosato of Italy, to reflect its broader range of application including data services. In 1995, due to its more global usage, the name was changed from European to Enhanced. DECT is recognized by the ITU as fulfilling the IMT-2000 requirements and thus qualifies as a 3G system. Within the IMT-2000 group of technologies, DECT is referred to as IMT-2000 Frequency Time (IMT-FT).

DECT was developed by ETSI but has since been adopted by many countries all over the World. The original DECT frequency band (1880–1900 MHz) is used in all countries in Europe. Outside Europe, it is used in most of Asia, Australia and South America. In the United States, the Federal Communications Commission in 2005 changed channelization and licensing costs in a nearby band (1920–1930 MHz, or 1.9 GHz), known as Unlicensed Personal Communications Services (UPCS), allowing DECT devices to be sold in the U.S. with only minimal changes. These channels are reserved exclusively for voice communication applications and therefore are less likely to experience interference from other wireless devices such as baby monitors and wireless networks.

The New Generation DECT (NG-DECT) standard was first published in 2007; it was developed by ETSI with guidance from the Home Gateway Initiative through the DECT Forum to support IP-DECT functions in home gateway/IP-PBX equipment. The ETSI TS 102 527 series comes in five parts and covers wideband audio and mandatory interoperability features between handsets and base stations. They were preceded by an explanatory technical report, ETSI TR 102 570. The DECT Forum maintains the CAT-iq trademark and certification program; CAT-iq wideband voice profile 1.0 and interoperability profiles 2.0/2.1 are based on the relevant parts of ETSI TS 102 527.

The DECT Ultra Low Energy (DECT ULE) standard was announced in January 2011 and the first commercial products were launched later that year by Dialog Semiconductor. The standard was created to enable home automation, security, healthcare and energy monitoring applications that are battery powered. Like DECT, DECT ULE standard uses the 1.9 GHz band, and so suffers less interference than Zigbee, Bluetooth, or Wi-Fi from microwave ovens, which all operate in the unlicensed 2.4 GHz ISM band. DECT ULE uses a simple star network topology, so many devices in the home are connected to a single control unit.

A new low-complexity audio codec, LC3plus, has been added as an option to the 2019 revision of the DECT standard. This codec is designed for high-quality voice and music applications such as wireless speakers, headphones, headsets, and microphones. LC3plus supports scalable 16-bit narrowband, wideband, super wideband, fullband, and 24-bit high-resolution fullband and ultra-band coding, with sample rates of 8, 16, 24, 32, 48 and 96 kHz and audio bandwidth of up to 48 kHz.

DECT-2020 New Radio protocol was published in July 2020; it defines a new physical interface based on cyclic prefix orthogonal frequency-division multiplexing (CP-OFDM) capable of up to 1.2 Gbit/s transfer rate with QAM-1024 modulation. The updated standard supports multi-antenna MIMO and beamforming, FEC channel coding, and hybrid automatic repeat request. There are 17 radio channel frequencies in the range from 450 MHz up to 5,875 MHz, and channel bandwidths of 1,728, 3,456, or 6,912 kHz. Direct communication between end devices is possible with a mesh network topology. In October 2021, DECT-2020 NR was approved for the IMT-2020 standard, for use in Massive Machine Type Communications (MMTC) industry automation, Ultra-Reliable Low-Latency Communications (URLLC), and professional wireless audio applications with point-to-point or multicast communications; the proposal was fast-tracked by ITU-R following real-world evaluations. The new protocol will be marketed as NR+ (New Radio plus) by the DECT Forum. OFDMA and SC-FDMA modulations were also considered by the ETSI DECT committee.

OpenD is an open-source framework designed to provide a complete software implementation of DECT ULE protocols on reference hardware from Dialog Semiconductor and DSP Group; the project is maintained by the DECT forum.

== Application ==
The DECT standard originally envisaged three major areas of application:

- Domestic cordless telephony, using a single base station to connect one or more handsets to the public telecommunications network.
- Enterprise premises cordless PABXs and wireless LANs, using many base stations for coverage. Calls continue as users move between different coverage cells, through a mechanism called handover. Calls can be both within the system and to the public telecommunications network.
- Public access, using large numbers of base stations to provide high capacity building or urban area coverage as part of a public telecommunications network.
- Wireless microphone systems, for speech-optimized applications with automatic frequency and interference management.

Of these, the domestic application (cordless home telephones) has been extremely successful. The enterprise PABX market, albeit much smaller than the cordless home market, has been very successful as well, and all the major PABX vendors have advanced DECT access options available. The public access application did not succeed, since public cellular networks rapidly out-competed DECT by coupling their ubiquitous coverage with large increases in capacity and continuously falling costs. There has been only one major installation of DECT for public access: in early 1998 Telecom Italia launched a wide-area DECT network known as "Fido" after much regulatory delay, covering major cities in Italy. The service was promoted for only a few months and, having peaked at 142,000 subscribers, was shut down in 2001.

DECT has been used for wireless local loop as a substitute for copper pairs in the "last mile" in countries such as India and South Africa. By using directional antennas and sacrificing some traffic capacity, cell coverage could extend to over 10 kilometres (6.2 mi). One example is the corDECT standard.

The first data application for DECT was Net^{3} wireless LAN system by Olivetti, launched in 1993 and discontinued in 1995. A precursor to Wi-Fi, Net^{3} was a micro-cellular data-only network with fast roaming between base stations and 520 kbit/s transmission rates.

Data applications such as electronic cash terminals, traffic lights, and remote door openers also exist, but have been eclipsed by Wi-Fi, 3G and 4G which compete with DECT for both voice and data.

== Characteristics ==
The DECT standard specifies a means for a portable phone or "Portable Part" to access a fixed telephone network via radio. Base station or "Fixed Part" is used to terminate the radio link and provide access to a fixed line. A gateway is then used to connect calls to the fixed network, such as public switched telephone network (telephone jack), office PBX, ISDN, or VoIP over Ethernet connection.

Typical abilities of a domestic DECT Generic Access Profile (GAP) system include multiple handsets to one base station and one phone line socket. This allows several cordless telephones to be placed around the house, all operating from the same telephone line. Additional handsets have a battery charger station that does not plug into the telephone system. Handsets can in many cases be used as intercoms, communicating between each other, and sometimes as walkie-talkies, intercommunicating without telephone line connection.

DECT operates in the 1880–1900 MHz band and defines ten frequency channels from 1881.792 MHz to 1897.344 MHz with a band gap of 1728 kHz.

DECT operates as a multicarrier frequency-division multiple access (FDMA) and time-division multiple access (TDMA) system. This means that the radio spectrum is divided into physical carriers in two dimensions: frequency and time. FDMA access provides up to 10 frequency channels, and TDMA access provides 24 time slots per every frame of 10 ms. DECT uses time-division duplex (TDD), which means that down- and uplink use the same frequency but different time slots. Thus a base station provides 12 duplex speech channels in each frame, with each time slot occupying any available channel – thus 10 × 12 = 120 carriers are available, each carrying 32 kbit/s.

DECT also provides frequency-hopping spread spectrum over TDMA/TDD structure for ISM band applications. If frequency-hopping is avoided, each base station can provide up to 120 channels in the DECT spectrum before frequency reuse. Each timeslot can be assigned to a different channel in order to exploit advantages of frequency hopping and to avoid interference from other users in asynchronous fashion.

DECT allows interference-free wireless operation to around 100 metres (110 yd) outdoors. Indoor performance is reduced when interior spaces are constrained by walls.

DECT performs with fidelity in common congested domestic radio traffic situations. It is generally immune to interference from other DECT systems, Wi-Fi networks, video senders, Bluetooth technology, baby monitors and other wireless devices.

=== Technical properties ===
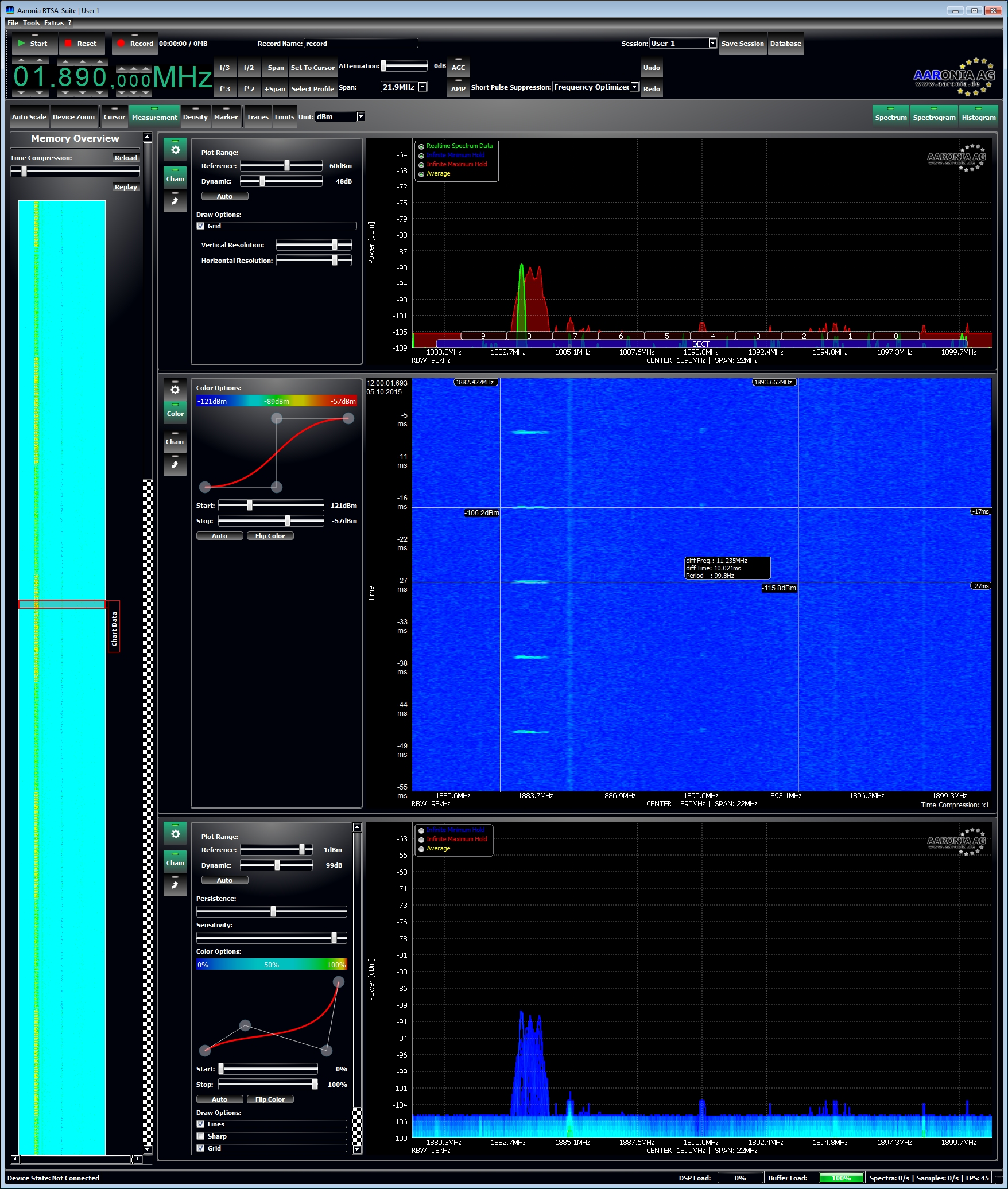
DECT pulse duration measurement (100 Hz, 10 ms) on channel 8

ETSI standards documentation ETSI EN 300 175 parts 1–8 (DECT), ETSI EN 300 444 (GAP) and ETSI TS 102 527 parts 1–5 (NG-DECT) prescribe the following technical properties:

- Audio codec:
  - mandatory:
    - 32 kbit/s G.726 ADPCM (narrow band),
    - 64 kbit/s G.722 sub-band ADPCM (wideband)
  - optional:
    - 64 kbit/s G.711 μ-law/A-law PCM (narrow band),
    - 32 kbit/s G.729.1 (wideband),
    - 32 kbit/s MPEG-4 ER AAC-LD (wideband),
    - 64 kbit/s MPEG-4 ER AAC-LD (super-wideband)
- Frequency: the DECT physical layer specifies RF carriers for the frequency ranges 1880 MHz to 1980 MHz and 2010 MHz to 2025 MHz, as well as 902 MHz to 928 MHz and 2400 MHz to 2483,5 MHz ISM band with frequency-hopping for the U.S. market. The most common spectrum allocation is 1880 MHz to 1900 MHz; outside Europe, 1900 MHz to 1920 MHz and 1910 MHz to 1930 MHz spectrum is available in several countries.
  - 1880–1900 MHz in Europe, as well as South Africa, Asia, Hong Kong, Australia, and New Zealand
  - 1786–1792 MHz in Korea
  - 1880–1895 MHz in Taiwan
  - 1893–1906 MHz (J-DECT) in Japan
  - 1900–1920 MHz in China (until 2003)
  - 1910–1920 MHz in Brazil
  - 1910–1930 MHz in Latin America
  - 1920–1930 MHz (DECT 6.0) in the United States and Canada
- Carriers (1.728 MHz spacing):
  - 10 channels in Europe and Latin America
  - 8 channels in Taiwan
  - 5 channels in the US, Brazil, Japan
  - 3 channels in Korea
- Time slots: 2 × 12 (up and down stream)
- Channel allocation: dynamic
- Average transmission power: 10 mW (250 mW peak) in Europe & Japan, 4 mW (100 mW peak) in the US

=== Physical layer ===
The DECT physical layer uses FDMA/TDMA access with TDD.

Gaussian frequency-shift keying (GFSK) modulation is used: the binary one is coded with a frequency increase by 288 kHz, and the binary zero with frequency decrease of 288 kHz. With high quality connections, 2-, 4- or 8-level differential PSK modulation (DBPSK, DQPSK or D8PSK), which is similar to QAM-2, QAM-4 and QAM-8, can be used to transmit 1, 2, or 3 bits per each symbol. QAM-16 and QAM-64 modulations with 4 and 6 bits per symbol can be used for user data (B-field) only, with resulting transmission speeds of up to 5.068 Mbit/s.

DECT provides dynamic channel selection and assignment; the choice of transmission frequency and time slot is always made by the mobile terminal. In case of interference in the selected frequency channel, the mobile terminal (possibly from suggestion by the base station) can initiate either intracell handover, selecting another channel/transmitter on the same base, or intercell handover, selecting a different base station altogether. For this purpose, DECT devices scan all idle channels at regular 30 s intervals to generate a received signal strength indication (RSSI) list. When a new channel is required, the mobile terminal (PP) or base station (FP) selects a channel with the minimum interference from the RSSI list.

The maximum allowed power for portable equipment as well as base stations is 250 mW. A portable device radiates an average of about 10 mW during a call as it is only using one of 24 time slots to transmit. In Europe, the power limit was expressed as effective radiated power (ERP), rather than the more commonly used equivalent isotropically radiated power (EIRP), permitting the use of high-gain directional antennas to produce much higher EIRP and hence long ranges.

=== Data link control layer ===
The DECT media access control layer controls the physical layer and provides connection oriented, connectionless and broadcast services to the higher layers.

The DECT data link layer uses Link Access Protocol Control (LAPC), a specially designed variant of the ISDN data link protocol called LAPD. They are based on HDLC.

GFSK modulation uses a bit rate of 1152 kbit/s, with a frame of 10 ms (11520 bits) which contains 24 time slots. Each slots contains 480 bits, some of which are reserved for physical packets and the rest is guard space. Slots 0–11 are always used for downlink (FP to PP) and slots 12–23 are used for uplink (PP to FP).

There are several combinations of slots and corresponding types of physical packets with GFSK modulation:

- Basic packet (P32) – 420 or 424 bits "full slot", used for normal speech transmission. User data (B-field) contains 320 bits.
- Low-capacity packet (P00) – 96 bits at the beginning of the time slot ("short slot"). This packet only contains 64-bit header (A-field) used as a dummy bearer to broadcast base station identification when idle.
- Variable capacity packet (P00j) – 100 + j or 104 + j bits, either two half-slots (0 ≤ j ≤ 136) or "long slot" (137 ≤ j ≤ 856). User data (B-field) contains j bits.
  - P64 (j = 640), P67 (j = 672) – "long slot", used by NG-DECT/CAT-iq wideband voice and data.
- High-capacity packet (P80) – 900 or 904 bits, "double slot". This packet uses two time slots and always begins in an even time slot. The B-field is increased to 800 bits..

The 420/424 bits of a GFSK basic packet (P32) contain the following fields:

- 32 bits – synchronization code (S-field): constant bit string AAAAE98AH for FP transmission, 55551675H for PP transmission
- 388 bits – data (D-field), including
  - 64 bits – header (A-field): control traffic in logical channels C, M, N, P, and Q
  - 320 bits – user data (B-field): DECT payload, i.e. voice data
  - 4 bits – error-checking (X-field): CRC of the B-field
- 4 bits – collision detection/channel quality (Z-field): optional, contains a copy of the X-field

The resulting full data rate is 32 kbit/s, available in both directions.

=== Network layer ===
The DECT network layer always contains the following protocol entities:

- Call Control (CC)
- Mobility Management (MM)

Optionally it may also contain others:

- Call Independent Supplementary Services (CISS)
- Connection Oriented Message Service (COMS)
- Connectionless Message Service (CLMS)

All these communicate through a Link Control Entity (LCE).

The call control protocol is derived from ISDN DSS1, which is a Q.931-derived protocol. Many DECT-specific changes have been made.

The mobility management protocol includes the management of identities, authentication, location updating, on-air subscription and key allocation. It includes many elements similar to the GSM protocol, but also includes elements unique to DECT.

Unlike the GSM protocol, the DECT network specifications do not define cross-linkages between the operation of the entities (for example, Mobility Management and Call Control). The architecture presumes that such linkages will be designed into the interworking unit that connects the DECT access network to whatever mobility-enabled fixed network is involved. By keeping the entities separate, the handset is capable of responding to any combination of entity traffic, and this creates great flexibility in fixed network design without breaking full interoperability.

DECT GAP is an interoperability profile for DECT. The intent is that two different products from different manufacturers that both conform not only to the DECT standard, but also to the GAP profile defined within the DECT standard, are able to interoperate for basic calling. The DECT standard includes full testing suites for GAP, and GAP products on the market from different manufacturers are in practice interoperable for the basic functions.

=== Security ===
The DECT media access control layer includes authentication of handsets to the base station using the DECT Standard Authentication Algorithm (DSAA). When registering the handset on the base, both record a shared 128-bit Unique Authentication Key (UAK). The base can request authentication by sending two random numbers to the handset, which calculates the response using the shared 128-bit key. The handset can also request authentication by sending a 64-bit random number to the base, which chooses a second random number, calculates the response using the shared key, and sends it back with the second random number.

The standard also provides encryption services with the DECT Standard Cipher (DSC). The encryption is fairly weak, using a 35-bit initialization vector and encrypting the voice stream with 64-bit encryption. While most of the DECT standard is publicly available, the part describing the DECT Standard Cipher was only available under a non-disclosure agreement to the phones' manufacturers from ETSI.

The properties of the DECT protocol make it hard to intercept a frame, modify it and send it later again, as DECT frames are based on time-division multiplexing and need to be transmitted at a specific point in time. Unfortunately very few DECT devices on the market implemented authentication and encryption procedures – and even when encryption was used by the phone, it was possible to implement a man-in-the-middle attack impersonating a DECT base station and revert to unencrypted mode – which allows calls to be listened to, recorded, and re-routed to a different destination.

After an unverified report of a successful attack in 2002, members of the deDECTed.org project actually did reverse engineer the DECT Standard Cipher in 2008, and as of 2010 there has been a viable attack on it that can recover the key.

In 2012, an improved authentication algorithm, the DECT Standard Authentication Algorithm 2 (DSAA2), and improved version of the encryption algorithm, the DECT Standard Cipher 2 (DSC2), both based on AES 128-bit encryption, were included as optional in the NG-DECT/CAT-iq suite.

DECT Forum also launched the DECT Security certification program which mandates the use of previously optional security features in the GAP profile, such as early encryption and base authentication.

=== Profiles ===
Various access profiles have been defined in the DECT standard:

- Public Access Profile (PAP) (deprecated)
- Generic Access Profile (GAP) – ETSI EN 300 444
- Cordless Terminal Mobility (CTM) Access Profile (CAP) – ETSI EN 300 824
- Data access profiles
  - DECT Multimedia Access Profile (DMAP) and Application Specific Access Profile (ASAP) – ETSI EN 301 650
  - Open Data Access Profile (ODAP) – ETSI TS 102 342
  - Radio in the Local Loop (RLL) Access Profile (RAP) – ETSI ETS 300 765
- Interworking profiles (IWP)
  - DECT/ISDN Interworking Profile (IIP) – ETSI EN 300 434
  - DECT/GSM Interworking Profile (GIP) – ETSI EN 301 242
  - DECT/UMTS Interworking Profile (UIP) – ETSI TS 101 863

== Additional specifications ==
=== DECT 6.0 ===
DECT 6.0 is a North American marketing term for DECT devices manufactured for the United States and Canada operating at 1.9 GHz. The "6.0" does not equate to a spectrum band; it was decided the term DECT 1.9 might have confused customers who equate larger numbers (such as the 2.4 and 5.8 in existing 2.4 GHz and 5.8 GHz cordless telephones) with later products. The term was coined by Rick Krupka, marketing director at Siemens and the DECT USA Working Group / Siemens ICM.

In North America, DECT suffers from deficiencies in comparison to DECT elsewhere, since the UPCS band (1920–1930 MHz) is not free from heavy interference. Bandwidth is half as wide as that used in Europe (1880–1900 MHz), the 4 mW average transmission power reduces range compared to the 10 mW permitted in Europe, and the commonplace lack of GAP compatibility among US vendors binds customers to a single vendor.

Before 1.9 GHz band was approved by the FCC in 2005, DECT could only operate in unlicensed 2.4 GHz and 900 MHz Region 2 ISM bands; some users of Uniden WDECT 2.4 GHz phones reported interoperability issues with Wi-Fi equipment.

North-American DECT 6.0 products may not be used in Europe, Pakistan, Sri Lanka, and Africa, as they cause and suffer from interference with the local cellular networks. Use of such products is prohibited by European Telecommunications Authorities, PTA, Telecommunications Regulatory Commission of Sri Lanka and the Independent Communication Authority of South Africa. European DECT products may not be used in the United States and Canada, as they likewise cause and suffer from interference with American and Canadian cellular networks, and use is prohibited by the Federal Communications Commission and Innovation, Science and Economic Development Canada.

DECT 8.0 HD is a marketing designation for North American DECT devices certified with CAT-iq 2.0 "Multi Line" profile.

=== NG-DECT/CAT-iq ===
Cordless Advanced Technology—internet and quality (CAT-iq) is a certification program maintained by the DECT Forum. It is based on New Generation DECT (NG-DECT) series of standards from ETSI.

NG-DECT/CAT-iq contains features that expand the generic GAP profile with mandatory support for high quality wideband voice, enhanced security, calling party identification, multiple lines, parallel calls, and similar functions to facilitate VoIP calls through SIP and H.323 protocols.

There are several CAT-iq profiles which define supported voice features:

- CAT-iq 1.0 – "HD Voice" (ETSI TS 102 527–1): wideband audio, calling party line and name identification (CLIP/CNAP)
- CAT-iq 2.0 – "Multi Line" (ETSI TS 102 527–3): multiple lines, line name, call waiting, call transfer, phonebook, call list, DTMF tones, headset, settings
- CAT-iq 2.1 – "Green" (ETSI TS 102 527–5): 3-party conference, call intrusion, caller blocking (CLIR), answering machine control, SMS, power-management
- CAT-iq Data – light data services, software upgrade over the air (SUOTA) (ETSI TS 102 527–4)
- CAT-iq IOT – Smart Home connectivity (IOT) with DECT Ultra Low Energy (ETSI TS 102 939)

CAT-iq allows any DECT handset to communicate with a DECT base from a different vendor, providing full interoperability. CAT-iq 2.0/2.1 feature set is designed to support IP-DECT base stations found in office IP-PBX and home gateways.

=== DECT-2020 ===
DECT-2020, also called NR+, is a new radio standard by ETSI for the DECT bands worldwide. The standard was designed to meet a subset of the ITU IMT-2020 5G requirements that are applicable to IOT and Industrial internet of things. DECT-2020 is compliant with the requirements for Ultra Reliable Low Latency Communications URLLC and massive Machine Type Communication (mMTC) of IMT-2020.

DECT-2020 NR has new capabilities compared to DECT and DECT Evolution:

- Better multipath operation (OFDM Cyclic Prefix)
- Better radio sensitivity (OFDM and Turbocodes)
- Better resistance to radio interference (co-channel interference rejection)
- Better bandwidth utilization
- Mesh deployment

The DECT-2020 standard has been designed to co-exist in the DECT radio band with existing DECT deployments. It uses the same Time Division slot timing and Frequency Division center frequencies and uses pre-transmit scanning to minimize co-channel interference.

== DECT for data networks ==
Other interoperability profiles exist in the DECT suite of standards, and in particular the DPRS (DECT Packet Radio Services) bring together a number of prior interoperability profiles for the use of DECT as a wireless LAN and wireless internet access service. With good range (up to 200 metres (660 ft) indoors and 6 kilometres (3.7 mi) using directional antennae outdoors), dedicated spectrum, high interference immunity, open interoperability and data speeds of around 500 kbit/s, DECT appeared at one time to be a superior alternative to Wi-Fi. The protocol capabilities built into the DECT networking protocol standards were particularly good at supporting fast roaming in the public space, between hotspots operated by competing but connected providers. The first DECT product to reach the market, Olivetti's Net^{3}, was a wireless LAN, and German firms Dosch & Amand and Hoeft & Wessel built niche businesses on the supply of data transmission systems based on DECT.

However, the timing of the availability of DECT, in the mid-1990s, was too early to find wide application for wireless data outside niche industrial applications. Whilst contemporary providers of Wi-Fi struggled with the same issues, providers of DECT retreated to the more immediately lucrative market for cordless telephones. A key weakness was also the inaccessibility of the U.S. market, due to FCC spectrum restrictions at that time. By the time mass applications for wireless Internet had emerged, and the U.S. had opened up to DECT, well into the new century, the industry had moved far ahead in terms of performance and DECT's time as a technically competitive wireless data transport had passed.

== Health and safety ==
DECT uses UHF radio, similar to mobile phones, baby monitors, Wi-Fi, and other cordless telephone technologies.

In North America, the 4 mW average transmission power reduces range compared to the 10 mW permitted in Europe.

The UK Health Protection Agency (HPA) claims that due to a mobile phone's adaptive power ability, a European DECT cordless phone's radiation could actually exceed the radiation of a mobile phone. A European DECT cordless phone's radiation has an average output power of 10 mW but is in the form of 100 bursts per second of 250 mW, a strength comparable to some mobile phones.

Most studies have been unable to demonstrate any link to health effects, or have been inconclusive. Electromagnetic fields may have an effect on protein expression in laboratory settings but have not yet been demonstrated to have clinically significant effects in real-world settings. The World Health Organization has issued a statement on medical effects of mobile phones which acknowledges that the longer term effects (over several decades) require further research.

== See also ==
- GSM Interworking Profile (GIP)
- IP-DECT
- CT2 (DECT's predecessor in Europe)
- Net^{3}
- CorDECT
- WDECT
- Unlicensed Personal Communications Services
- Microcell
- Wireless local loop

== Standards ==
ETSI EN 300 175 V2.9.1 (2022–03). Digital Enhanced Cordless Telecommunications (DECT) – Common Interface (CI)

- "ETSI EN 300 175-1. Part 1: Overview" (PDF).
- "ETSI EN 300 175-2. Part 2: Physical Layer (PHL)" (PDF).
- "ETSI EN 300 175-3. Part 3: Medium Access Control (MAC) layer" (PDF).
- "ETSI EN 300 175-4. Part 4: Data Link Control (DLC) layer" (PDF).
- "ETSI EN 300 175-5. Part 5: Network (NWK) layer" (PDF).
- "ETSI EN 300 175-6. Part 6: Identities and addressing" (PDF).
- "ETSI EN 300 175-7. Part 7: Security features" (PDF).
- "ETSI EN 300 175-8. Part 8: Speech and audio coding and transmission" (PDF).

ETSI TS 103 636 v2.1.1 (2024–10). DECT-2020 New Radio (NR)

- "ETSI TS 103 636-1. Part 1: Overview" (PDF).
- "ETSI TS 103 636-2. Part 2: Radio reception and transmission requirements" (PDF).
- "ETSI TS 103 636-3. Part 3: Physical layer" (PDF).
- "ETSI TS 103 636-4. Part 4: MAC layer" (PDF).
- "ETSI TS 103 636-5. Part 5: DLC and Convergence layer" (PDF).

Digital Enhanced Cordless Telecommunications (DECT)

- "ETSI TS 103 634 V1.5.1 (2024-06). Low Complexity Communication Codec plus (LC3plus)" (PDF).
- "ETSI TS 103 706 V1.1.1 (2022-01). Advanced Audio Profile" (PDF).
- "ETSI EN 300 700 V2.2.1 (2018-12). Wireless Relay Station (WRS)" (PDF).
- "ETSI EN 300 444 V2.5.1 (2017-10). Generic Access Profile (GAP)" (PDF).
- "ETSI EN 301 649 V2.3.1 (2015-03). DECT Packet Radio Service (DPRS)" (PDF).
- "ETSI EN 300 757 V1.5.1 (2004-09). Low Rate Messaging Service (LRMS) including Short Messaging Service (SMS)" (PDF).
- "ETSI EN 300 824 V1.3.1 (2001-08). Cordless Terminal Mobility (CTM) – CTM Access Profile (CAP)" (PDF).
