= DSP Group =

American semiconductor company

DSP Group, Inc.
- Industry: VoIP, Telecommunications, Communication systems
- Founded: 1987; 39 years ago
- Fate: Acquired by Synaptics
- Headquarters: San Jose, California
- Key people: Eliyahu Ayalon (chairman), Ofer Elyakim (CEO)
- Products: IP Telephony, Media Gateways, Wireless chipsets, Mobile VoIP
- Revenue: ▲US$ 225.48 million (2010)
- Operating income: ▼$ 9.68 million (2010)
- Net income: ▼$ 7.42 million (2010)
- Number of employees: 409 (2009)
- Website: dspg.com at the Wayback Machine (archived 2011-02-09)

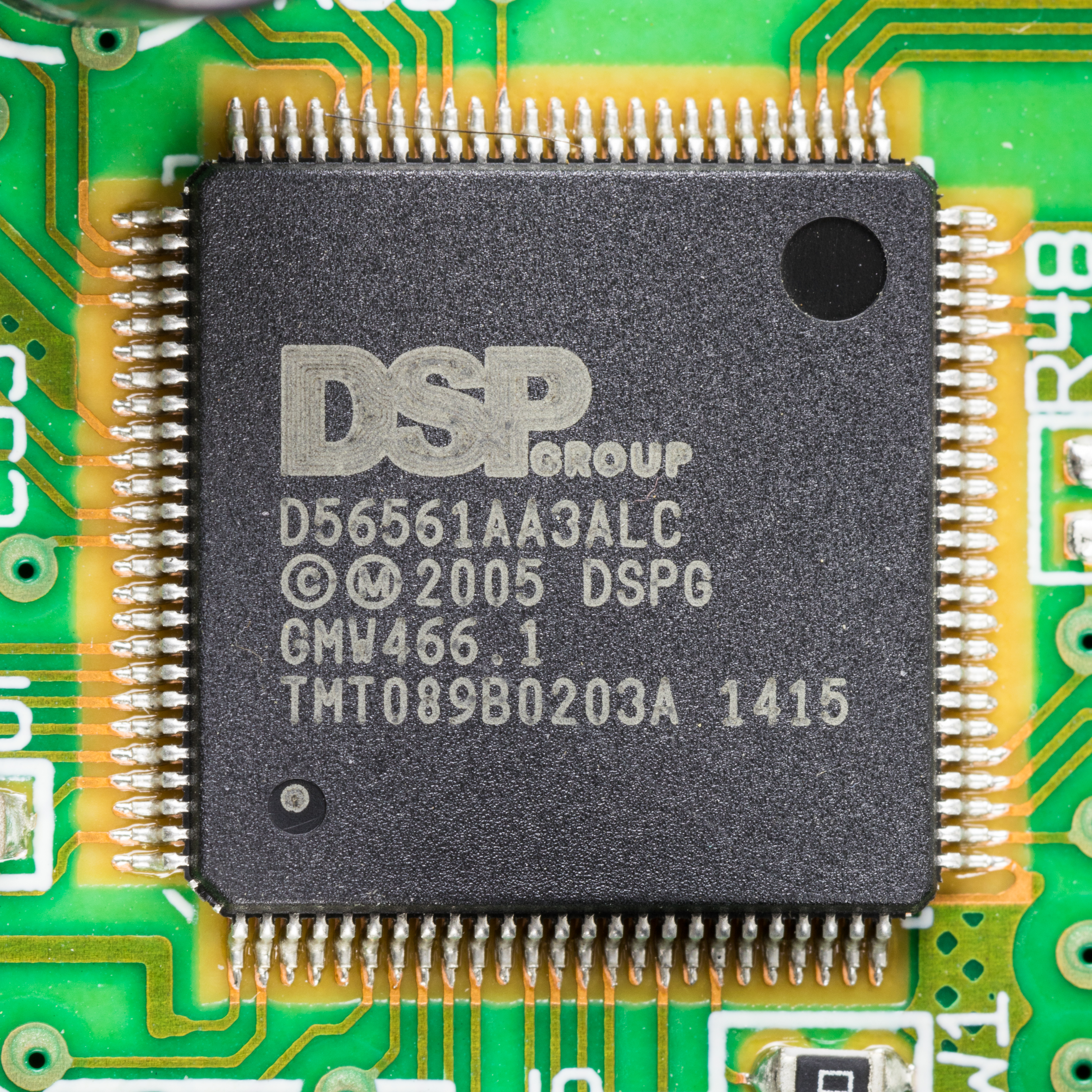
A DSP Group chip

DSP Group, Inc. was an American company that manufactured chipsets for VoIP, multimedia, and digital cordless applications. Founded in 1987 with headquarters in San Jose, California, DSP Group employed over 400 people at three US sites and offices in Germany, Scotland, Israel, India, Hong Kong and Japan until it was acquired by Synaptics.

== History ==
DSP Group was founded in 1987 by Davidi Gilo, who served as the company's CEO and chairman until 1993.

DSP Group developed the world's first telephony answering device (TAD) speech processor in 1989. The company entered the digital cordless industry with the acquisition of Advanced Micro Devices' (AMD) 900 MHz technology in 1999, and the subsequent development of 900 MHz narrow-band cordless and 2.4 GHz multi-handset technology.

In 1993 one of the company's co-founders and its CTO Shabtai Adlersberg started a new company AudioCodes, with the initial investment provided by the DSP Group. AudioCodes became a provider of VoIP technology, and had an initial public offering on the NASDAQ in 1999. In 2004 DSP Group sold all its holdings in AudioCodes making a significant profit on its initial investment.

In 1994 the DSP Group had an initial public offering on the NASDAQ.

In 1996 DSP Group spun off its cellular chip design and development division into a new company called DSP Communications (DSPC). DSP Communications had an initial public offering on the NASDAQ the same year. In 1999 Intel bought DSP Communications for US$1.6 billion.

In November 2002, DSP's IP licensing division and the Irish company Parthus Technologies Plc were merged to form a new company called CEVA, Inc.

DSP Group entered into the multimedia communications sector with the acquisition of Teleman Multimedia in 2003. Incorporating VoIP and Wi-Fi technologies obtained through the acquisition of VoicePump and Bermai, DSP Group entered the residential multimedia communications over broadband market with the 2006 development of a chipset integrating DECT and Wi-Fi technologies with an application processor. DSP Group acquired NXP Semiconductors' cordless and VoIP terminals business in 2007.

On 30 August 2021, San Jose, California-based developer of human interface (HMI) hardware and software Synaptics announced that it would acquire the company.

DSP Group provided integrated circuits for residential communications products in three areas: connected multimedia screens, VoIP cordless phones, and digital cordless products.

Affiliations included:

- DECT Forum, for the digital enhanced cordless telecommunications standard
- European Telecommunications Standards Institute (ETSI)
- CAT-iq Marketing Working Group
- ETSI CAT-iq working groups
- Wi-Fi Alliance
- CableLabs
- Home Gateway Initiative (HGI)

=== Business data ===
- DSP Group at Google Finance
- DSP Group at Yahoo! Finance
- DSP Group at Hoover's
- DSP Group at Standard and Poor's
- DSP Group SEC filings at EDGAR Online
- DSP Group IR site
