= Bhaskar Ramamurthi =

Indian academic

- Born: 17 April 1959 (age 67); Chennai, India
- Education: University of California, Santa Barbara, Indian Institute of Technology Madras
- Known for: Wireless communications, corDECT standard
- Scientific career
- Fields: Electrical engineering
- Workplaces: Indian Institute of Technology Madras
- Website: ee.iitm.ac.in/~bhaskar

Bhaskar Ramamurthi (born 17 April 1959) is an Indian academic who served as the director of Indian Institute of Technology Madras from 2011 to 2022. He succeeded M. S. Ananth and was succeeded by Kamakoti Veezhinathan.

== Career ==
Bhaskar Ramamurthi obtained his B. Tech in Electrical and Electronics Engineering from IIT Madras in 1980 and his M.S. and Ph.D. degrees in electrical engineering from the University of California, Santa Barbara, in 1982 and 1985 respectively. He was awarded the University of California Regents Fellowship during his doctoral studies. After obtaining his doctorate, he worked at AT&T Bell Labs for two years before joining the faculty of the Department of Electrical Engineering at IIT Madras in 1986, where he served as director from 2011 to 2022. He served as the Dean of Planning at IIT Madras before taking over the role of director in September 2011.

His research interests are on topics in modulation and coding for mobile communications, wireless communication networks and design and implementation of wireless local loop systems. He is one of the founding members of the Telecommunications and Computer Networking Group (TeNeT) group at IIT Madras. He is the principal architect of corDECT wireless local loop system and Broadband corDECT Wireless DSL System, widely deployed in India and 15 countries. He is a Fellow of the Indian National Academy of Engineering since 2000. He was elected as a Fellow of IEEE, effective from January 2015. In 2025, Bhaskar Ramamurthi was elected to the US National Academy of Engineering.

== Awards and honours ==
- Fellow of the Indian National Academy of Engineering, from 2000
- Honorary Director of the Centre of Excellence in Wireless Technology
- Honorary Fellow of the International Medical Sciences Academy
- Vasvik Award for Electronic Sciences and Technology, 2000
- Tamil Nadu Scientist Award for Engineering and Technology, 2003
- India Semiconductor Association TechnoVisionary Award, 2011
- Doyens of Madras Award, 2014
- IEEE Fellow, from 1 January 2015
- RWTH Honorary Fellow Award from RWTH Aachen University, Aachen, Germany, February 2020
