= Hoft =

Hoft is a surname. Notable people with the surname include:

- Arend van 't Hoft (born 1933), Dutch racing cyclist
- Cyril Hoft (1896–1949), Australian rules footballer
- Jim Hoft, conservative pundit

== See also ==
- Hoeft
- Holt (surname)
