= Net3 =

DECT-based wireless networking system from 1992

Net^{3} was a Wi-Fi-like system developed, manufactured and commercialised by Olivetti in the early 1990s. It could wirelessly connect PCs to an Ethernet fixed LAN at a speed of up to 512 kbit/s, over a very wide area. It was a micro-cellular system, in which each base station had an effective range of about 100m indoors, 300m outdoors, and the system supported seamless handover between base stations.

== Design and history ==
The system was based on the DECT standard, published in 1992. A prototype system was first demonstrated at the Telecom '91 show in Geneva in October 1991, and is believed to be the first public demonstration of the DECT transmission system. The product was launched in June 1993, and was the first product based on the DECT standard to reach the market, narrowly beating Siemens' highly successful Gigaset cordless telephone. It is also believed to be the first wireless LAN to be sold on the European market.

In its first version, the adapter cards consisted of half-size PC cards connected to an external desktop radio unit of modest dimensions. The second version, launched at Telecom '95, consisted of a PCMCIA card and a small external radio unit suitable for portable use.

The system was developed in the laboratories of Olivetti Sixtel, the telecommunications technology division of Olivetti in Ivrea, Italy. At a time when knowledge of commercial digital radio technology was scarce in Italy, the group began research in 1988 and developed in-house a high level of capability in DECT technology, including patented technology that became fundamental to the standard. The development was funded partly from corporate venture resources, partly from ESPRIT funding, and partly from an unusual but highly effective tool of industrial policy, invented by Augusto Vighi of the Istituto Superiore delle Poste e Telecomunicazioni. Vighi placed a contract for proof-of-concept DECT demonstration systems with a consortium of Italian technology companies, covering the full range of DECT applications. This accelerated the development not only of the Net3 wireless LAN by Olivetti, but of the FIDO public system by Italtel and of a complete wireless PABX by SELTA.

Net3 was originally conceived as a means to substitute LAN cabling in problematic buildings, which are especially numerous in the historic centres of Italian cities. In practice this was not a fast-growing or eager market, and the product eventually instead found success when integrated with rugged portable computers on forklift trucks in large warehouses and stockyards. A system was also installed inside a steel works and worked reliably despite the very high levels of electrical interference.

The team developing Net3 was also deeply involved in the development of the DECT standards, and contributed the chairmen of the DECT standards groups that designed the DECT network protocols and the data transport and interworking protocols. As a result, the DECT standards contained a high level of standardised, embedded support for wireless LAN functionality. The product benefited greatly from the availability of dedicated spectrum (1880-1900 MHz)throughout Europe thanks to a European directive on DECT, and from a single-stop type approval process arising from DECT's status as a pan-European standard. Although a very leading-edge product, Net3 was nevertheless able to exploit the availability of early semiconductor devices designed and priced to meet the mass consumer market for DECT-based cordless telephones.

In 1995 Olivetti cancelled all its commercial telecommunications products as part of its strategy of transformation into a telecoms operator. The Net3 product was progressively withdrawn from the market. The technology was repurposed to work as a high performance, low cost wireless local-loop infrastructure, supporting both toll-quality voice and broadband internet access. A pilot system was built and operated in Ivrea. The approach eventually floundered on the difficulty of redistributing signals within the apartment blocks so prevalent in the Italian urban fabric, and the Net3 team was eventually disbanded in 1997.
