= Ticket machine =

Vending machine that produces paper or electronic tickets

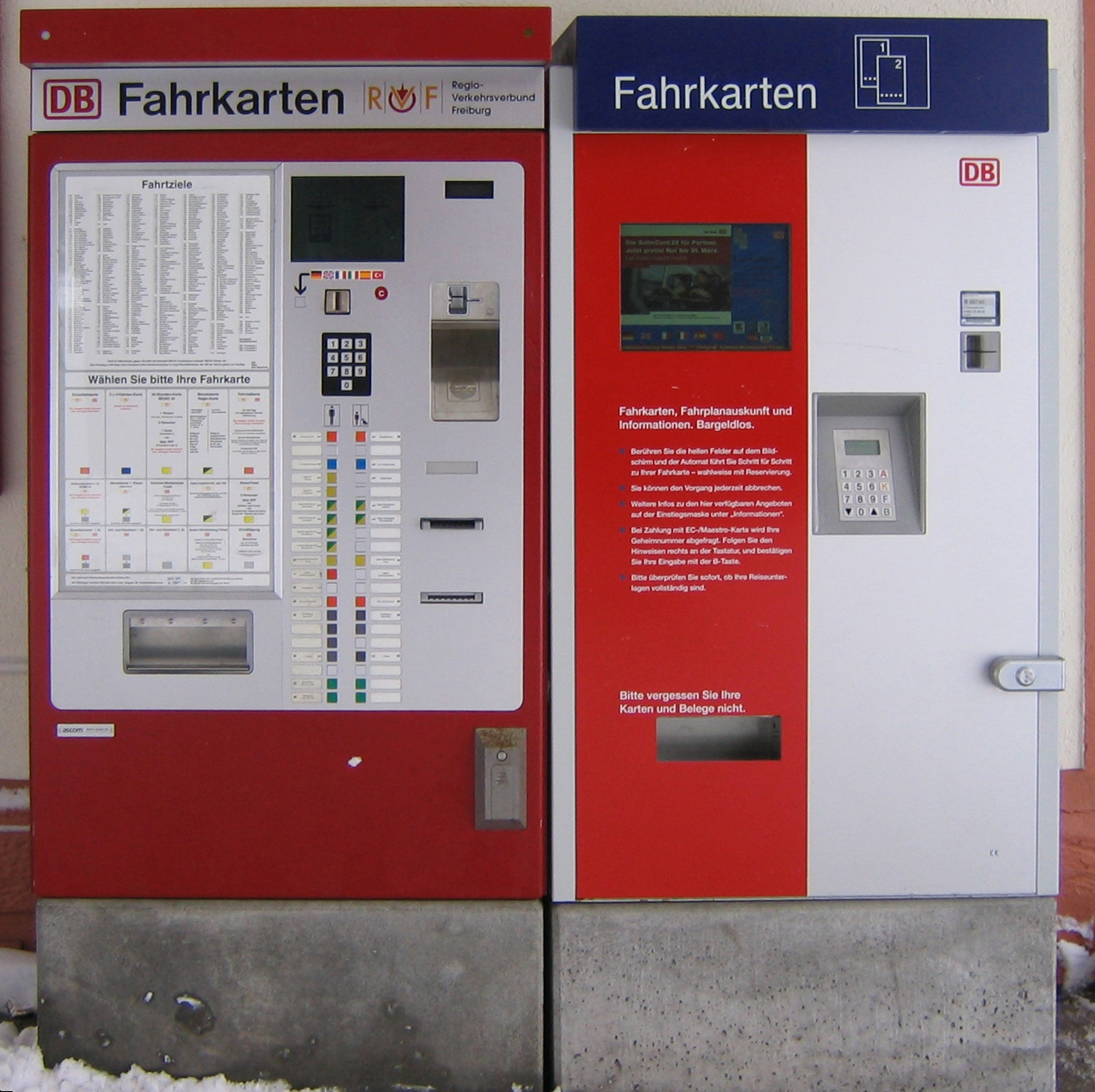
Pushbutton and touch screen Deutsche Bahn ticket machines in Hinterzarten, Germany

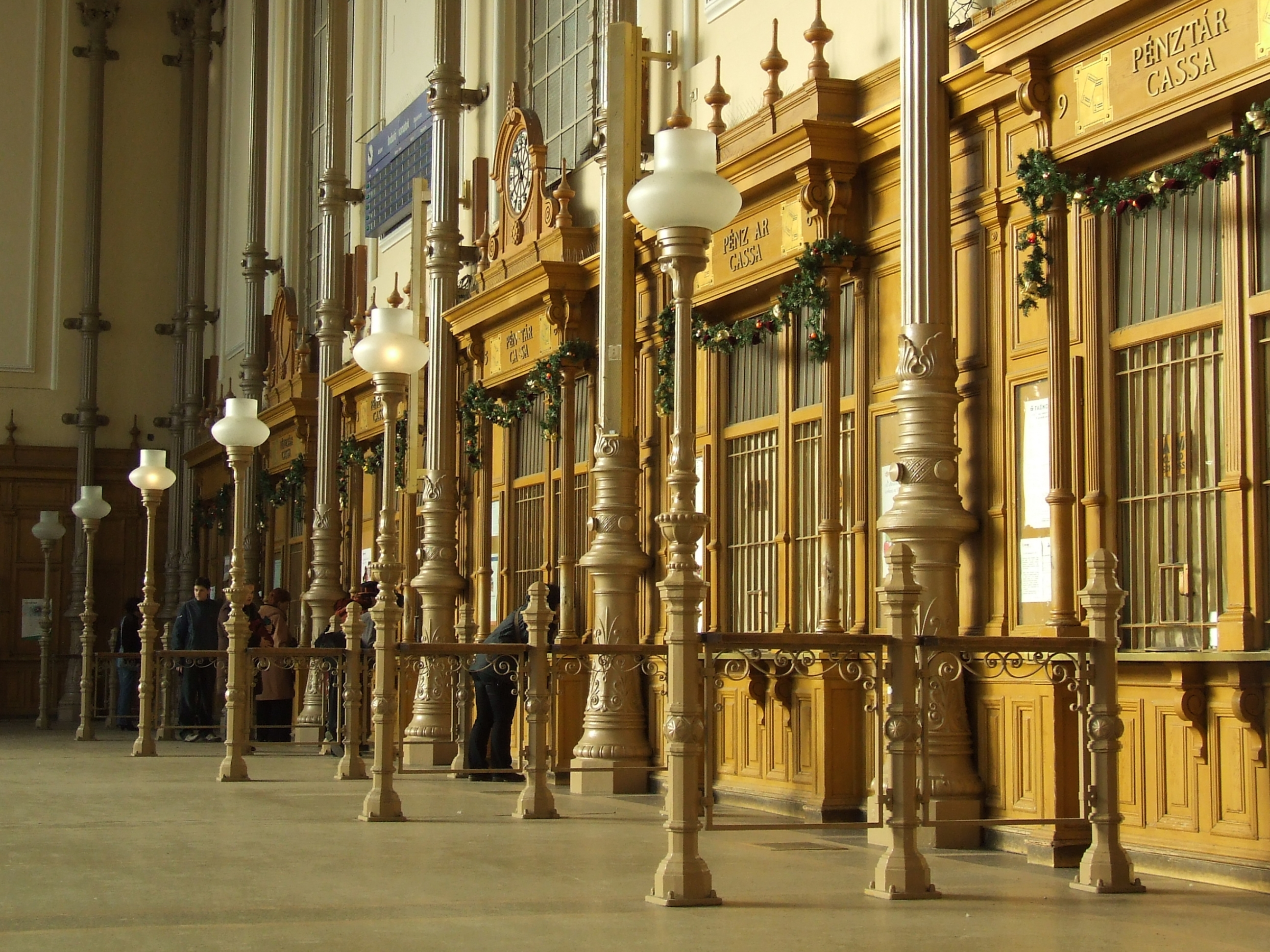
In addition to ticket machines, most larger railway stations also feature staffed ticket counters. Pictured: Ticket counters at the Nyugati Railway Station in Budapest, Hungary

A ticket machine, also known as a ticket vending machine (TVM), is a vending machine that produces paper or electronic tickets, or recharges a stored-value card or smart card or the user's mobile wallet, typically on a smartphone. For instance, ticket machines dispense train tickets at railway stations, transit tickets at metro stations and tram tickets at some tram stops and in some trams. Token machines may dispense the ticket in the form of a token which has the same function as a paper or electronic ticket. The typical transaction consists of a user using the display interface to select the type and quantity of tickets and then choosing a payment method of either cash, credit/debit card or smartcard. The ticket(s) are then printed on paper and dispensed to the user, or loaded onto the user's smartcard or smartphone.

== Ticket and fare formats ==
For most of the twentieth century, ticket machines issued paper tickets, or tokens worth one fare each. Later, fare value was loaded onto stored-value cards (first paper, later smart cards). Passengers could load any amount within a range; it did not necessarily have to correspond to any particular single fare. The cards could be reloaded until their expiration date, again with any monetary amount within a given range.

To encourage usage of ticket machines and reduce the need for salespersons, machine prices may in some cases be lower than those at a ticket counter.

== Timeline ==
- 1904: first self-service ticket machines on the Central London Railway, now part of London Underground
- 1954: Toronto Subway opens and has tokens in machines from day one
- 1977: San Diego–based airline PSA introduces vending machines for airline tickets

== Staff-operated machines ==
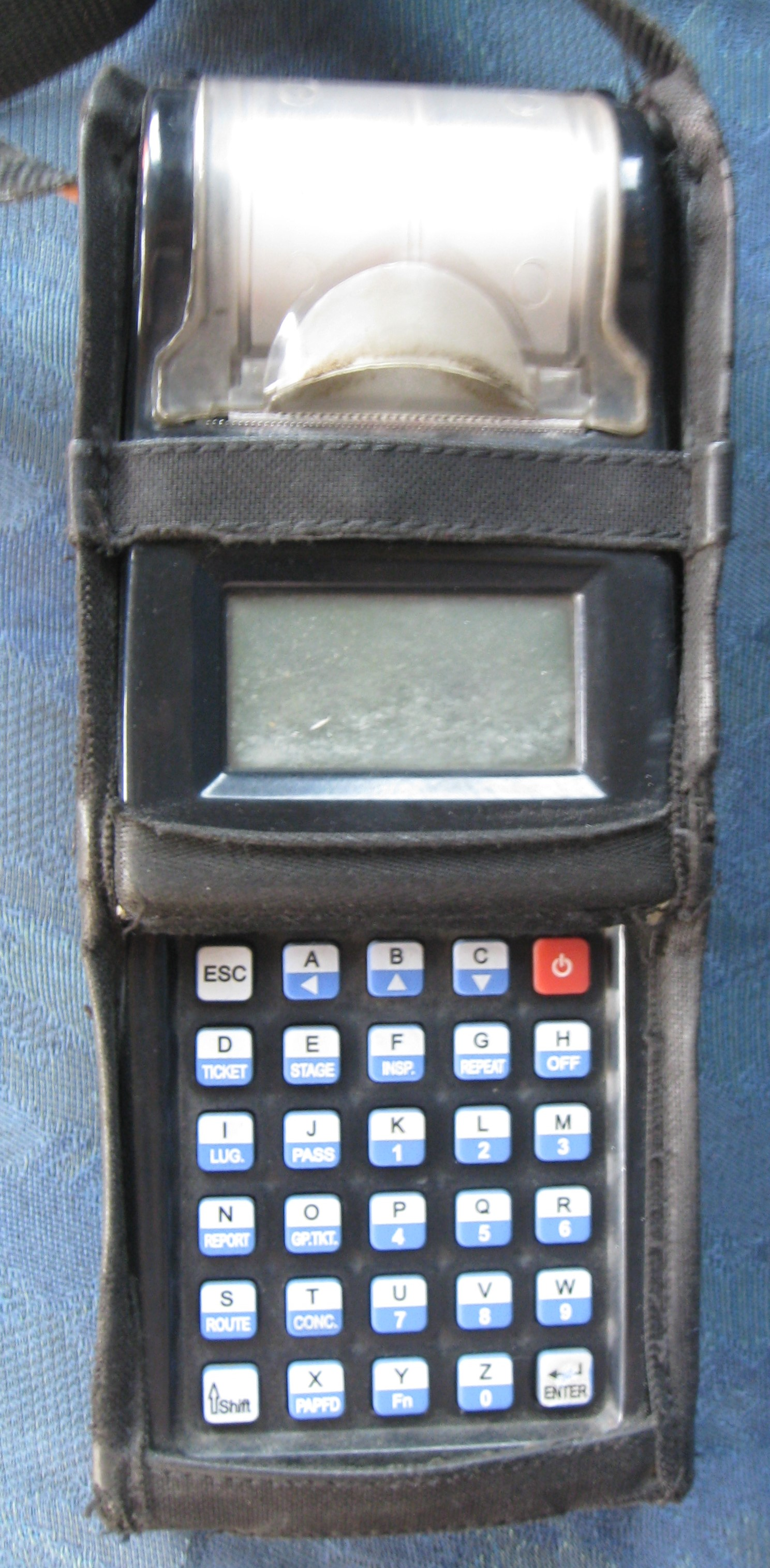
A handheld ticket machine used in BEST buses in Mumbai

Mechanical ticket machines were used by bus drivers and conductors since the late 1920s. Their functions may include printing tickets, recording of sales and payments. Some manufacturers are MicroFx, Almex, Setright, AEG, CAMP (Compagnie d'Ateliers Mecaniques de Precision), Gibson GFI Genfare, Parkeon, Xerox, Beckson and Corvia (Ticketer).

Since the 1970s (jobs), electronic computer terminals and printers are used.

Handheld ticket machines are used on buses in India to sell tickets, validate smart cards and renew passes. These machines replaced the earlier manual fare collection system where tickets were often punched to indicate journey and fare stages.

== Enforcement ==
In many countries where trains and urban transport tickets operate largely on the honor system (with enforcement by roving inspectors or conductors), there are also machines in stations (or in vehicles) for validating tickets. This is for the situation in which one buys a ticket in advance and decides to use it later. Usually, the ticket is time-stamped to determine its validity period. A common problem is forgetting to validate, and then being fined as if one had no ticket(s). Such machines are generally not used in the United States. Nearly all American mass transit networks operating on the honor system expect their users to buy tickets immediately before use; regular riders can avoid that inconvenience by buying period passes in advance (often from the same machines that sell daily or one-time tickets). Recently, however, commuter rail systems like Metrolink have adopted the use of validators for at least some tickets.

== Issues ==
Ticket machines that are out of service or accept 'exact change only' result in losses for transport providers.

== Applications ==
Ticket machines are also often used for amusement parks, cinemas (in those cases sometimes called ticketing kiosks), car parking (see pay and display), as well as those that issue free tickets—for example, those for virtual queueing.

Japan uses ticket machines in restaurants, cafes and other establishments. Customers select an item on the machine, insert money into the machine then receive a voucher that can be exchanged for their order, unlike a vending machine where the customer would receive their item. Some ticket machines are standalone machines while other versions of the machine are located at the counter.

== Gallery ==
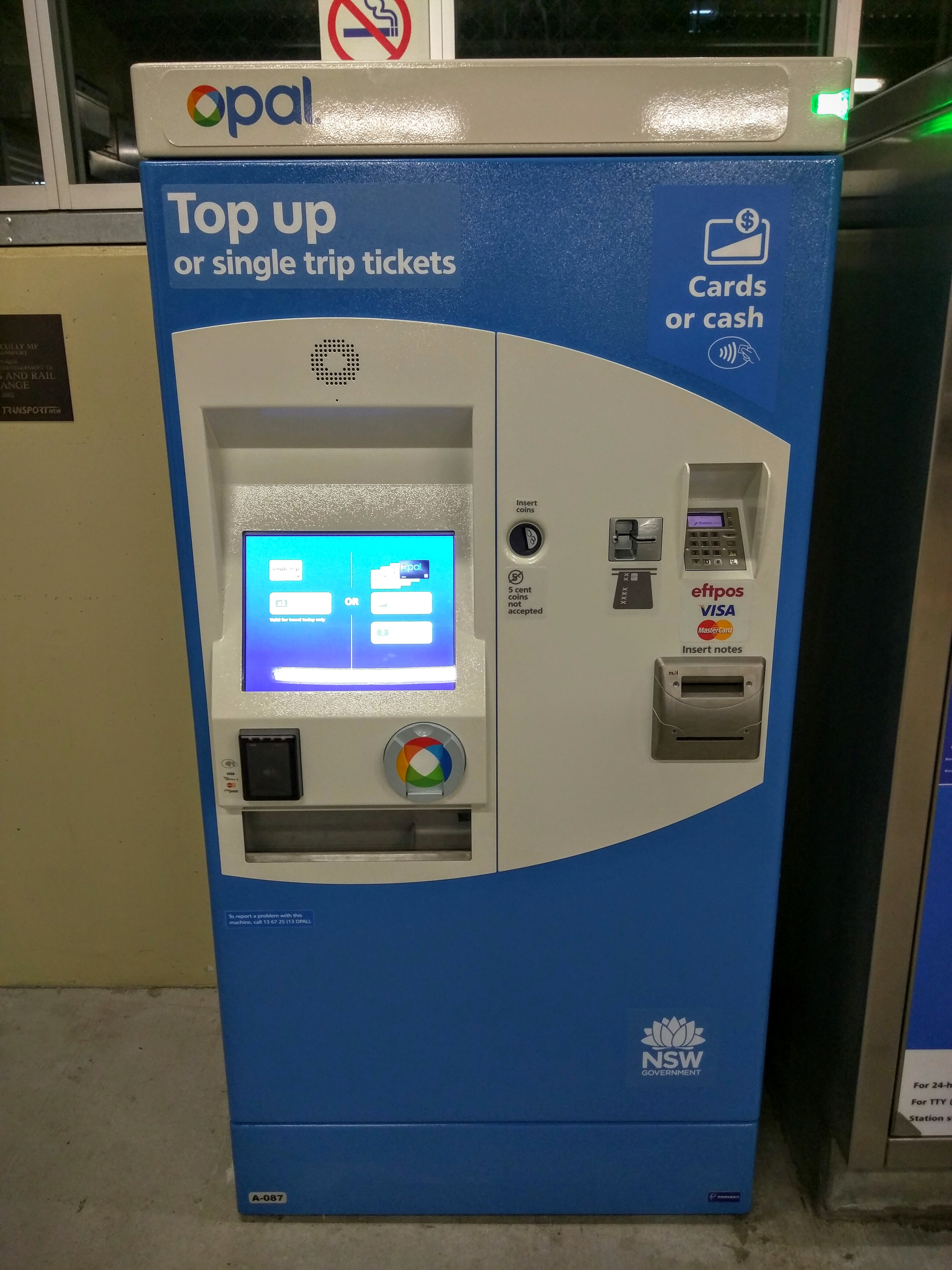
Opal card ticket and top-up machine in Sydney, Australia

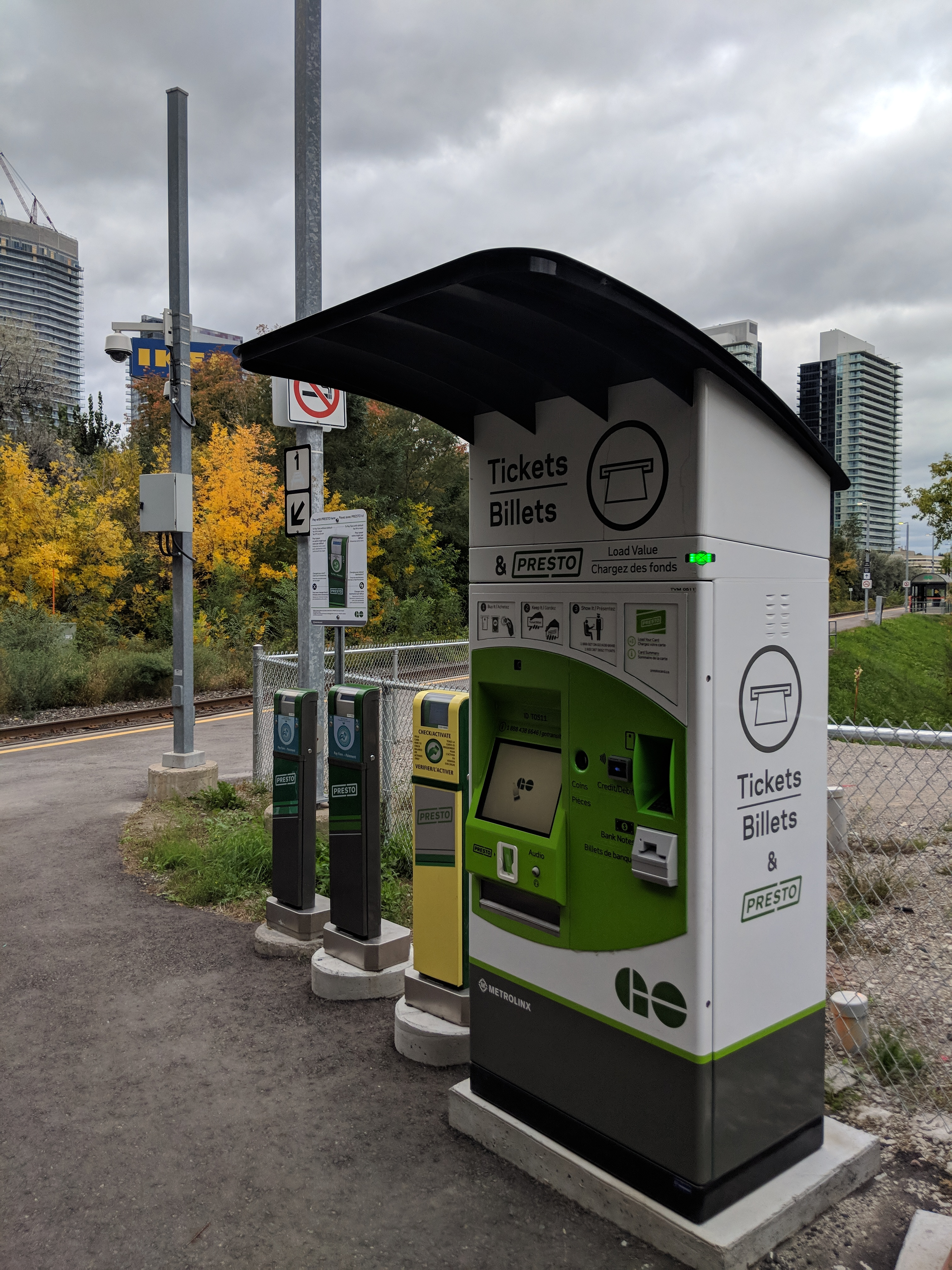
A ticket and Presto card top-up machine at a suburban train station in Toronto

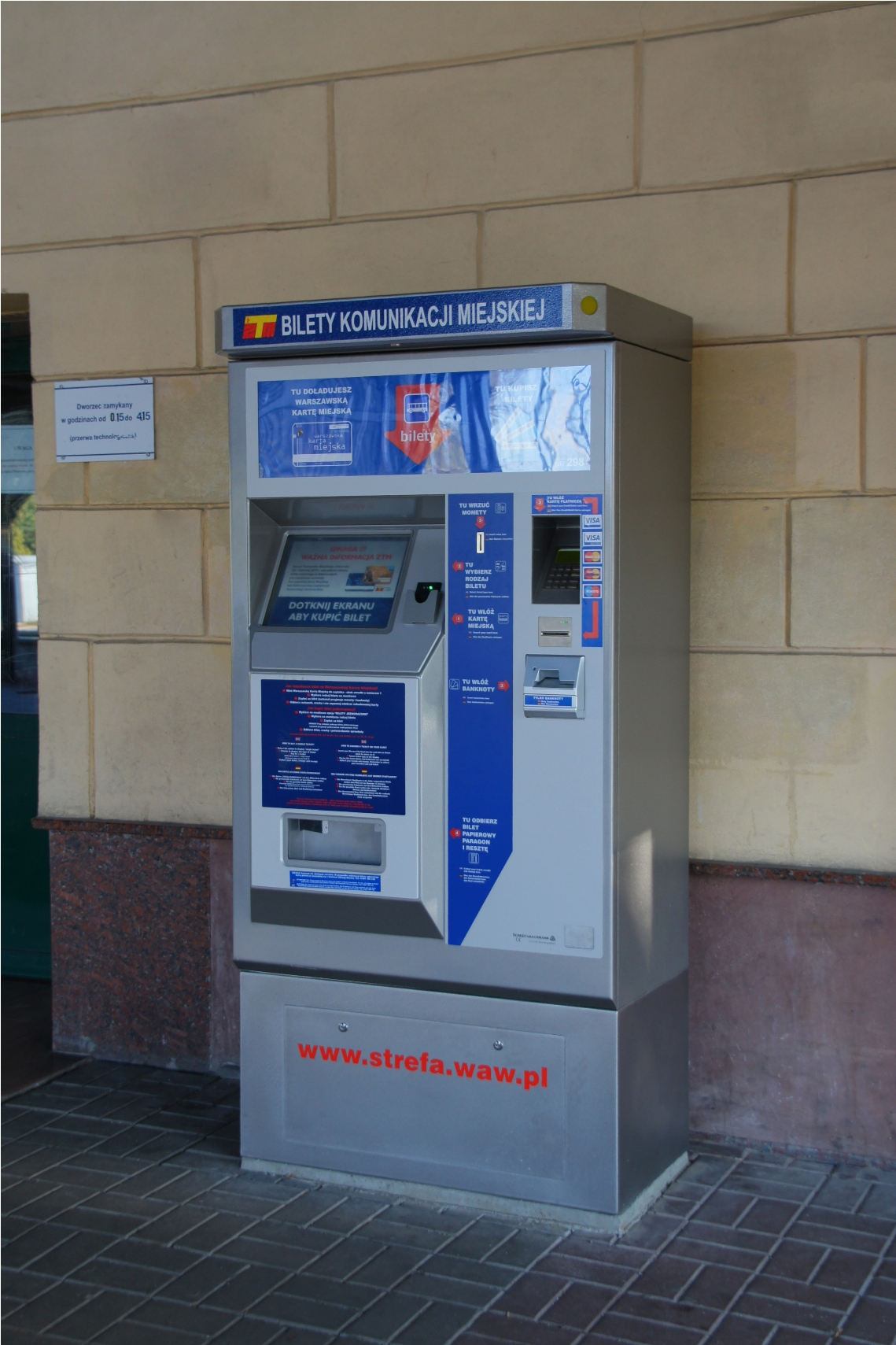
Ticket machine in Otwock, Poland

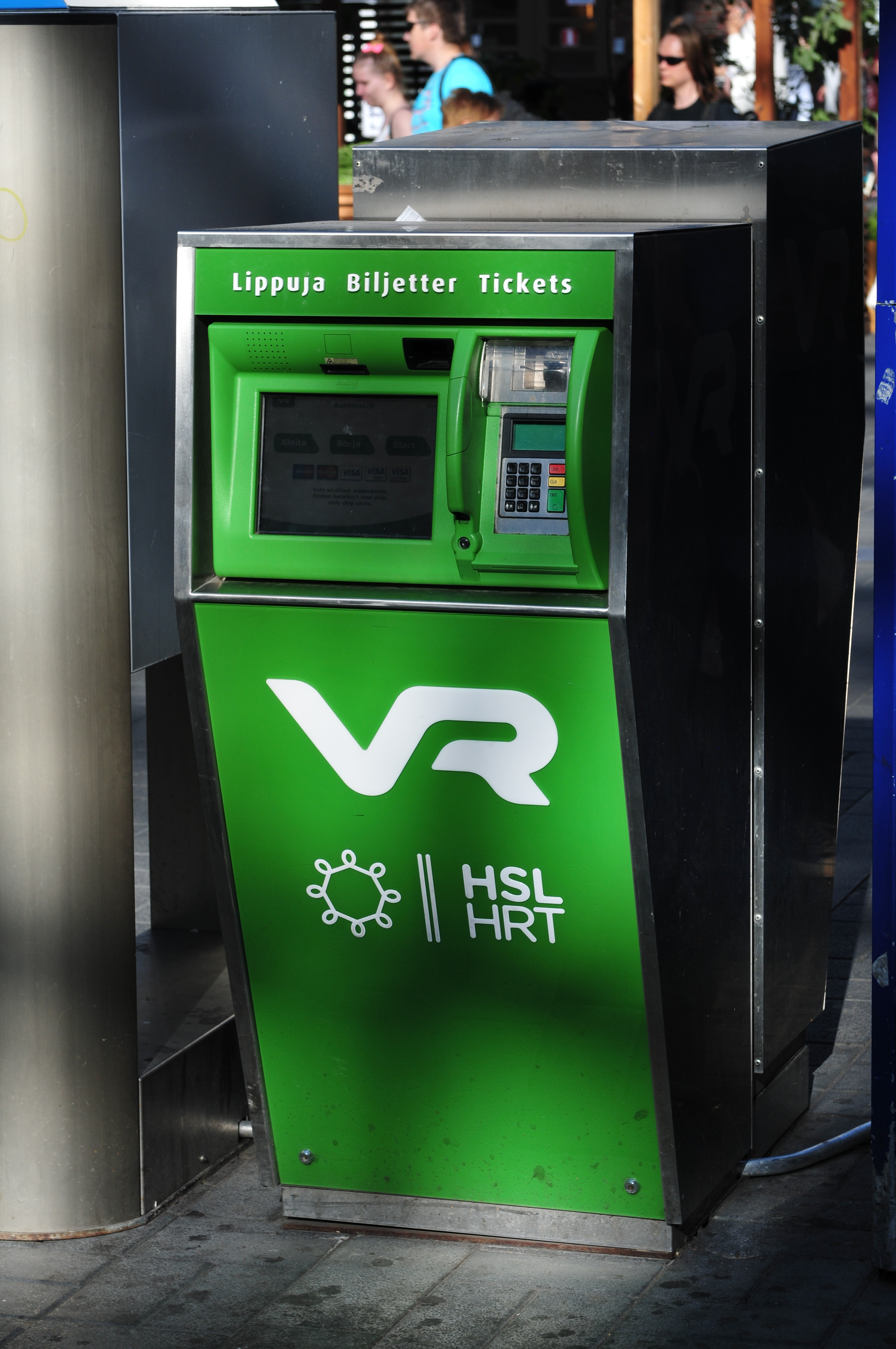
A VR ticket machine at the Helsinki Central Station in Helsinki, Finland

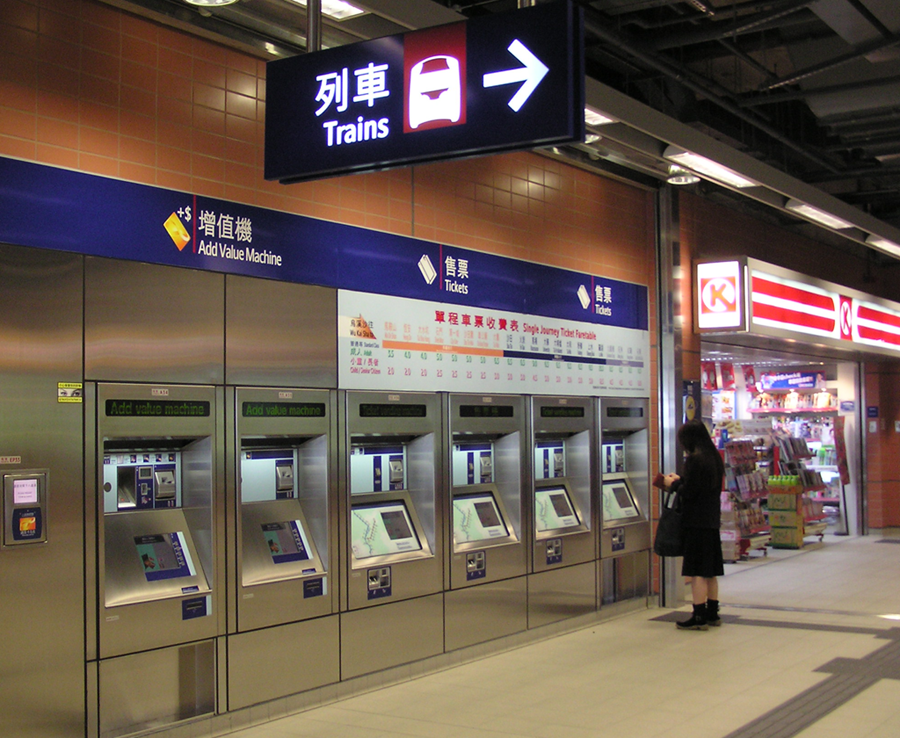
Ticket machines in Wu Kai Sha station of Hong Kong's MTR

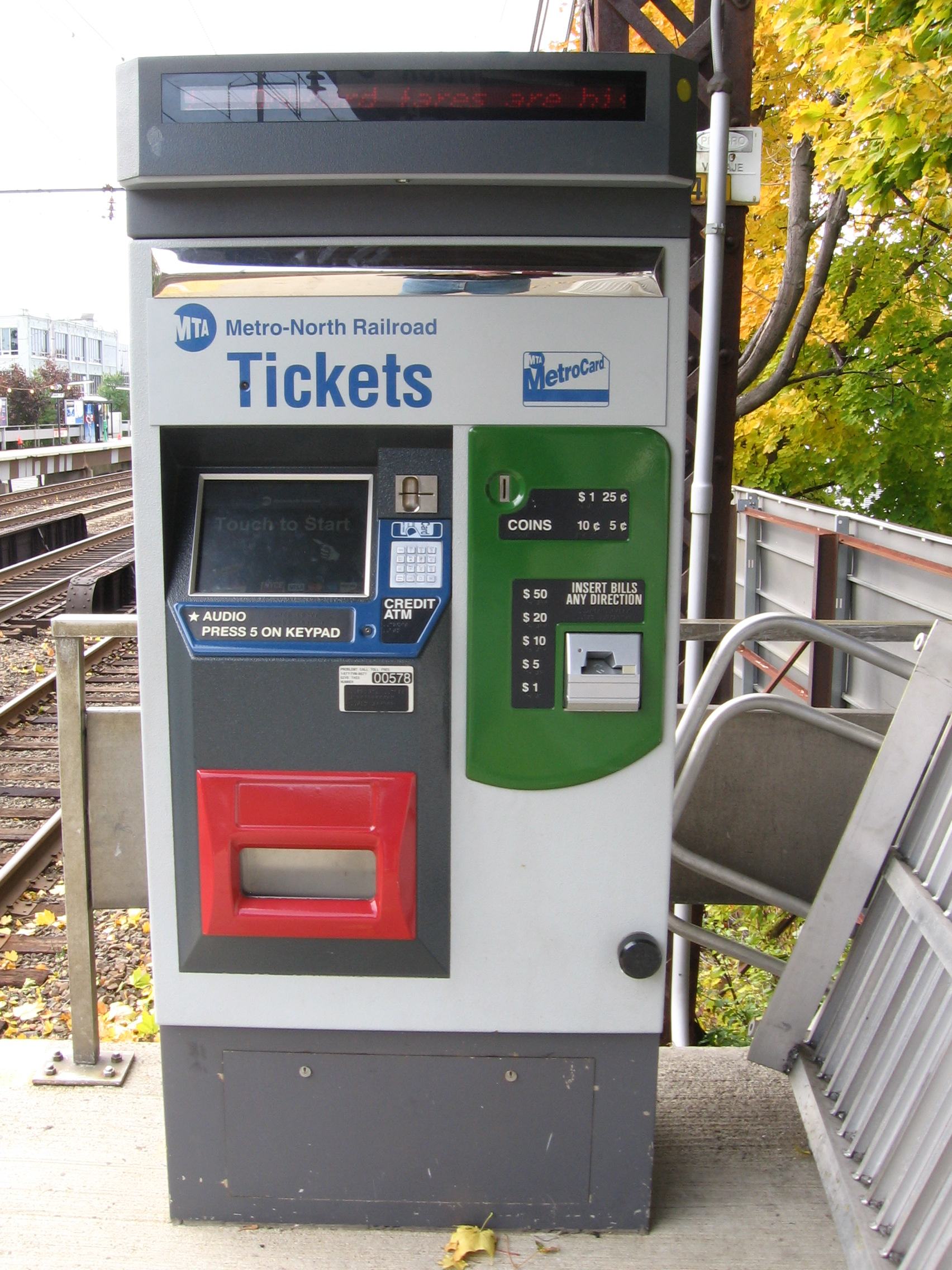
Machine for Metro-North Railroad, a metropolitan New York City commuter rail system, United States.

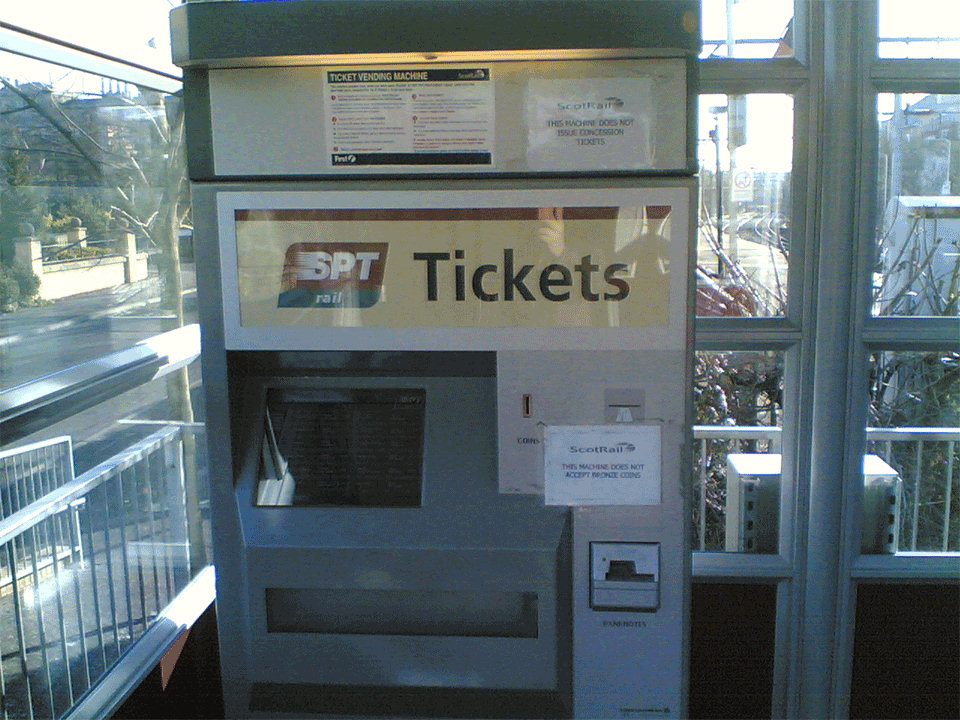
A ticket machine at the Jordanhill railway station in Scotland

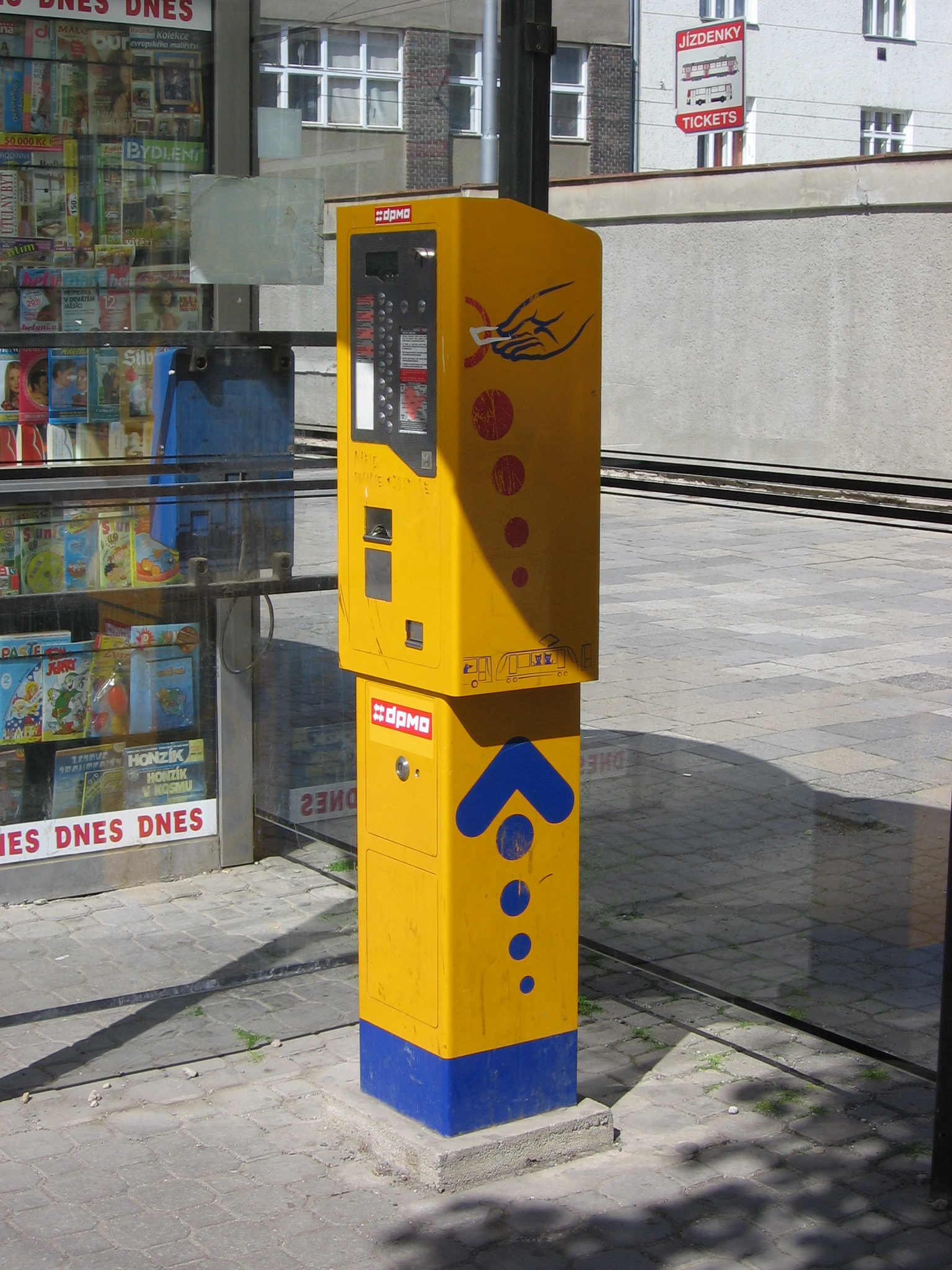
Ticket Machine in Olomouc, Czech Republic

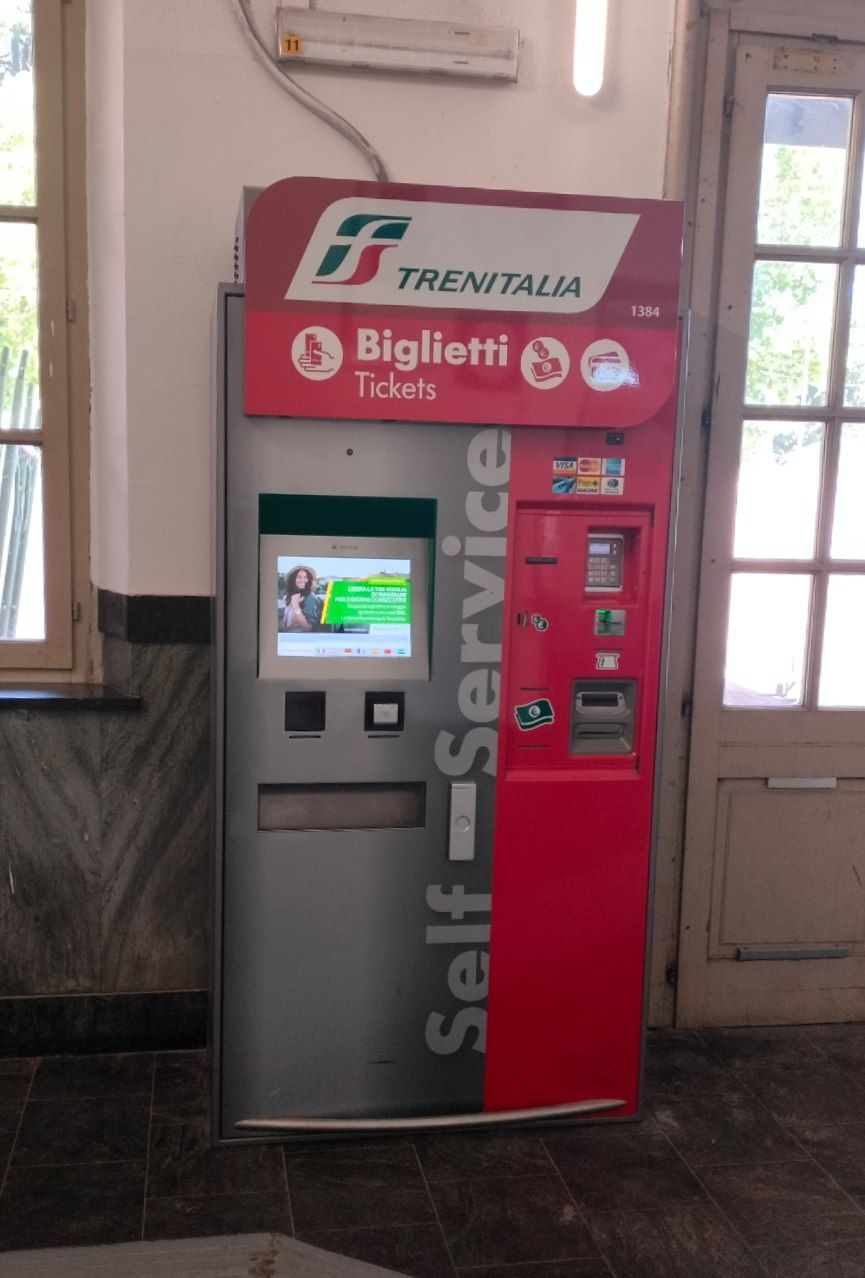
Trenitalia's ticket Machine at the Acqui Terme railway station

== See also ==
- List of tram and light-rail transit systems
- Self service
- Ticketing kiosk
