= DECT-2020 =

Radio standard by ETSI

DECT-2020, also called NR+, is a radio standard by ETSI for the DECT bands worldwide. The standard was designed to meet a subset of the ITU IMT-2020 5G requirements that are applicable to IOT and Industrial internet of things. DECT-2020 is compliant with the requirements for Ultra Reliable Low Latency Communications URLLC and massive Machine Type Communication (mMTC) of IMT-2020.

DECT-2020 NR has new capabilities compared to DECT and DECT Evolution:

- Better multipath operation (OFDM Cyclic Prefix)
- Better radio sensitivity (OFDM and Turbocodes)
- Better resistance to radio interference (co-channel interference rejection)
- Better bandwidth utilization
- Mesh deployment

The DECT-2020 standard has been designed to co-exist in the DECT radio band with existing DECT deployments. It uses the same Time Division slot timing and Frequency Division center frequencies and uses pre-transmit scanning to minimize co-channel interference.

== Applications ==
DECT NR+ (called DECT-2020 NR in ETSI) primarily focuses on addressing the needs of local area deployments for two use case areas: massive Machine Type Communication (mMTC) and Ultra-Reliable Low Latency Communication (URLLC) as defined for 5G networks application areas. The release 1 of the standard targets several applications within these use cases, including Smart Metering and Smart grid, Industrial internet of things, Building automation, and Professional audio

DECT NR+ decentralized and autonomous networking capability was specifically designed for Metering and Smart Grid applications, and mesh networking application in general. The technology can scale up to millions of devices within a single network.

The low latency communications URLLC is suitable for various use cases of Industry 4.0. These applications encompass robotics, monitoring and predictive maintenance and others. NR+ supports these use cases through its low latency and high reliability, dedicated frequency band, and high density and scalability

Regarding Professional Audio and PMSE applications, DECT NR+ offers the necessary features of low latency and high reliability. This makes it suitable for applications requiring real-time audio transmission and performance as required by professional audio systems.

== Technology ==
DECT NR+ technology is specified by DECT committee in the ETSI. The specifications for NR+ are called DECT-2020 in ETSI.

== Co-existence with classic DECT ==
An important design criteria for NR+ was to co-exist with Classic DECT communications. This allows NR+ to use the DECT reserved radio bands 1, 2 and 9, in the frequency range of 1880-1930 MHz. DECT reserved radio bands are license free, but devices need to pass certification ensuring correct operation on the bands.

== Topologies ==
NR+ supports 3 topologies

1. Mesh network
2. Star network
3. Point-to-Point Link

NR+ Mesh network is based on a clustered tree In all these network topologies the NR+ assumes that a device, called FT node, manages the radio resource usage in the cluster or link it controls.

The Point-to-point and star networks enable dedicated links, with reserved capacity for scheduled transmissions. A leaf node, called PT node in NR+, can ask for certain resource reservation for it when it associates to the FT node. As this reservation can be done only for the next link, Mesh networking with multiple relaying links in the path relies on random access channel usage where the devices needing to communicate compete for the access window defined by the FT node. This increases the communication delays in Mesh.

== Mesh operation ==
The benefits of mesh networking network topology and operation are robustness for changes or errors and coverage extension.

Robustness is the result of the autonomous decisions of the devices. There is no single point of failure. NR+ also supports having multiple gateway devices, called Sinks, connecting the NR+ mesh network to Internet. All the devices autonomously measure parent FT device's radio link quality, and can switch to another FT device if a better link or shorter route to sink is available. Similarly, if a parent device is not acknowledging messages, or is not sending the periodic beacon advertisement, a device will look for alternative parents. The mesh network heals itself in error situations and changes in the network.

Each device added to the network may act as a FT device, extending the network coverage. The sinks are configured first and start advertising the network in beacon messages. Devices scan radio channels, and associate to the parent they hear advertising the network and cluster. Associated devices can act as FT devices, and extend the network by selecting a channel with least traffic and start forwarding the network advertisement beacons. This extends the coverage for each FT device that joins the network.

== NR+ protocol layers ==
Overall description of the technology and protocol layers are provided in the DECT-2020 New Radio (NR); Part 1: Overview; Release 1 specification

=== Convergence Layer ===
Convergence layer offers identification and multiplexing of the traffic of different applications and services using the NR+ communications. CVG operates end-to-end between the NR+ network nodes. It is analogous to ports in UDP or TCP protocol. Like UDP and TCP, CVG offers both unreliable and reliable messaging services, datagram or flow control service and segmentation and reassembly for messages.

Convergence layer provides security with encryption and integrity protection of messages end-to-end in the NR+ network.

=== Data Link Control Layer ===
Data link control layer is the message routing service for NR+ networks. Routing decisions are done in each device in the network, there is no central routing table. DLC routing operates in 3 modes:

1. Uplink routing, to sink device: each node forwards message to parent
2. Downlink routing: from sink to FT or PT device in the network. Messages are forwarded to each FT device in the network until the destination device's parent device can deliver the message to the destination device.
3. Horizontal routing, between devices in the network with hop limited flooding

Unicast, multicast and broadcast routing is supported.

As the NR+ network has internal routing and addresses it can operate without Internet Protocol routing services. Internet protocols can be carried in NR+ networks.

=== Medium Access Control layer ===
Medium access control main services are radio resource control and data transfer.

Radio resource control ensures the #Co-Existence with Classic DECT. To do this, FT devices periodically scan the radio channel they operate on, and map busy time slots measured to be in use assuming it is an on-going Classic DECT connection. FT devices allocate the channel access time for the child devices on free time slots, preserving error free communications on the busy slots time slots. Channel access allocations are sent in beacon messages to all devices in the cluster.

MAC layer also provides link scope encryption and integrity protection.

=== Physical Layer ===
Physical layer uses Cyclic prefix version of OFDM as the core technology. The technologies provide well-known behaviour in challenging radio conditions.

PHY layer provides error detection to higher layers, Forward error correction and HARQ with soft combining. Received messages with errors are combined with re-transmissions, making it possible to decode correct message even if the re-transmission too contained errors.

NR+ radio can operate on frequencies below 6 GHz. Standard defined speeds are up to gigabits per second. Radio implementations of course vary in the speeds achieved and frequencies supported.

The DECT-2020 standard defines different Modulation Coding Schemes which provide theoretical throughput capabilities at a given frequency based on different parameters implemented.

== Security ==
NR+ defines message encryption and integrity protection in both CVG and MAC layers. Encryption and integrity protection use own separate keys on the 2 layers. The encryption is security is based on AES with key length of 128 bits. Integrity protection is based on same algorithm and key length NR+ does not define the key distribution mechanism "the number of key-pairs and the key distribution is outside of the scope of the present document" although it has been studied

== Future DECT-2020 work in ETSI ==
The DECT technical committee has started specification work for Release 2 of the standard in June 2023.
