= Hoeft =

Hoeft or Höft is a surname. Notable people with the surname include:

- Billy Hoeft (1932–2010), American baseball player
- Carl Hoeft (born 1974), New Zealand rugby union footballer
- Rainer Höft (born 1956), East German handball player

== See also ==
- Hoeft & Wessel AG, a German software company
- Hoeft State Park a park in Michigan, United States
