= CorDECT =

Wireless local loop standard

corDECT is a wireless local loop standard developed in India by IIT Madras and Midas Communications at Chennai, under leadership of Prof Ashok Jhunjhunwala, based on the DECT digital cordless phone standard.

== Overview ==
The technology is a Fixed Wireless Option, which has extremely low capital costs and is ideal for small start ups to scale, as well as for sparse rural areas. It is very suitable for ICT4D projects and India has one such organization, n-Logue Communications that has aptly done this.

The full form of DECT is Digital Enhanced Cordless Telecommunications, which is useful in designing small capacity WLL (wireless in local loop) systems. These systems are operative only on LOS Conditions and are very much affected by weather conditions.

System is designed for rural and sub urban areas where subscriber density is medium or low. "corDECT" system provides simultaneous voice and Internet access. Following are the main parts of the system.

DECT Interface Unit (DIU)
This is a 1000 line exchange provides E1 interface to the PSTN. This can cater up to 20 base stations. These base stations are interfaced through ISDN link which carries signals and power feed for the base stations even up to 3 km.

Compact Base Station (CBS)
This is the radio fixed part of the DECT wireless local loop. CBSs are typically mounted on a tower top which can cater up to 50 subscribers with 0.1 erlang traffic.

Base Station Distributor (BSD)
This is a traffic aggregator used to extend the range of the wireless local-loop where 4 CBS can be connected to this.

Relay Base Station (RBS)

This another technique used to extend the range of the corDECT wireless local loop up to 25 km by a radio chain.

Fixed Remote Station (FRS)
This is the subscriber-end equipment used the corDECT wireless local loop which provides standard telephone instrument and Internet access up to 70 kbit/s through Ethernet port.

The new generation corDECT technology is called Broadband corDECT which supports provides broadband Internet access over wireless local loop.

== See also ==
- PAS
