= DECT Ultra Low Energy =

Wireless communication standard

Digital Enhanced Cordless Telecommunications - Ultra Low Energy (DECT Ultra Low Energy or DECT ULE) is a low-power wireless communication standard for smart home applications.

DECT ULE originated from the DECT and NG-DECT (Cat-iq) technology, used in home automation, home security, and climate control. The ULE technology is promoted by the ULE Alliance, a non-profit organization, located in Bern, Switzerland. In May 2013, ETSI released the specification of the ULE standard (Technical Specification TS 102 939–01).

== Overview ==
The basic ULE wireless network uses a “star network topology”; i.e. there is one main device, called “base”, which controls the network; the “base” is wirelessly connected to “nodes”, which usually are devices with dedicated functions, such as sensors, remote controls, actuators, smart meters, etc. Some examples of node devices – door locks, smoke detectors, motion detectors, remote controls, gas and electricity meters, baby monitors, elderly care, etc.

ULE communication range is among the longest in the short range wireless communication technologies: over 50 meters in buildings and up to 300 meters in the open air. For the few cases where this range is not sufficient, repeaters can be used to extend the range. Similarly to DECT, ULE can also use more complex network architecture, with several bases connected with each other to cover extended areas (such as offices and larger buildings).

ULE enables simultaneous data and voice communication; this means that sensors are not limited to indicating the event, but also enable voice interface. A good example is a pendant device for elderly care, which in case of emergency enables person carrying it not only indicate of an emergency situation, but also communicate with a remotely located caretaker, or service station as with regular cordless phone, but all with the simple press of a button.

Enhancements were made to the DECT transport layer level by ETSI Technical Group DECT to adapt it to the requirements of the ULE wireless sensor networks:

- Low power operation, which enables ULE devices to operate on batteries for extended time period of years
- Extended security – ULE is using strong 128 bit AES encryption scheme vs. 64 bit encryption of DECT

Similarly to DECT, ULE uses a dedicated radio frequency, outmatching other technologies, such as Zigbee, Z-Wave, Bluetooth and others in terms of stability.

Primary application areas of ULE based wireless networks are for home automation, home security and climate control. Each of these application areas represent variety of dedicated devices. Many home gateways, deployed worldwide integrate DECT and implementing the DECT base functionality. These gateways are usually software upgradable. A home gateway which already has DECT functionality can become ULE enabled by software upgrade.

ULE Transport and Physical layers are defined and standardized by ETSI. The ULE physical layer is identical to DECT physical layer, while the Transport layer was enhanced to better fit requirements of wireless sensor networks.

ULE Alliance developed and defined HAN-FUN application layer protocol (Home Area Network FUNctional protocol). The HAN FUN protocol defines the profiles of devices and sets requirements for application level interoperability of ULE based devices. The first version of HAN FUN (released in November 2013) defines profiles of over two dozen different devices.

== Standards ==
ETSI TS 102 939. Digital Enhanced Cordless Telecommunications (DECT) – Ultra Low Energy (ULE) – Machine to Machine Communications

- "ETSI TS 102 939-1 V1.3.1 (2017-10). Part 1: Home Automation Network (phase 1)" (PDF).
- "ETSI TS 102 939-2 V1.4.1 (2024-05). Part 2: Home Automation Network (phase 2)" (PDF).
