= Ascom (company) =

Swiss telecommunications company

Ascom Holding AG
- Type: Public
- Traded as: SIX: ASCN
- Industry: Communication; Healthcare; Software; Manufacturing
- Founded: 1987; 39 years ago
- Headquarters: Baar (ZG)
- Key people: David Hale (CEO)
- Revenue: CHF 292.1 million (2025)
- Number of employees: 1'358 (31 December 2025)
- Website: https://www.ascom.com

Ascom Holding AG is a Swiss company providing communication and collaboration solutions for the acute care, long-term care and enterprise sectors. Its solutions are based on intelligent integrations with software and hardware that are open source and compatible with third-party solutions. The company has subsidiaries in 19 countries and a workforce of 1'358 employees worldwide.

Ascom registered shares (symbol ASCN) are listed on the SIX Swiss Exchange in Zurich. Ascom (Schweiz) AG is a subsidiary with the former company names Hasler AG, Hasler Ascom AG and Ascom AG.

Ascom services are based on VoWiFi, IP-DECT, Nurse Call, paging technologies, smartphones, apps and software suites for healthcare and enterprise organizations. Founded in the 1950s as TATECO (an abbreviation of Tore Andersson, Tele Control) based in Gothenburg, Sweden, Wireless Solutions became part of Hasler Holding and is part of Ascom Holding since the merger of Hasler with Autophon in 1987, listed on the Swiss Stock Exchange.

The former division Ascom Network Testing was sold on 30 September 2016 to Infovista.

The former Autelca division of Ascom Holding provided ticket vending machines to railways in Great Britain under the name Ascom EasyTicket.
