= IP-DECT =

Technology used for on-site wireless communications

IP-DECT is a technology used for on-site wireless communications. It uses the DECT air interface for reliable wireless voice and data communication between handsets and base stations and the well established VoIP technology for the corded voice communication between base stations and server functions.

The advantage is the circuit switched approach and therefore better specified quality of service for vocal communication than with Wireless LAN.

A DECT phone must remain in proximity to its own base (or repeaters thereof), and WLAN devices have a better range given sufficient access points, however voice over WLAN handsets impose significant design and maintenance complexity for large networks to ensure roaming facilities and high quality-of-service.

There are some of the traditional telephone equipment manufacturers and smaller enterprises that offer IP-DECT systems, both for residential (single-cell base station/access points), as well as for enterprise usage (multi-cell with multiple base stations/access points, and/or seamless handoff between cells) where it is important to cover large areas with a maintained speech path.

== Companies ==
For enterprise use, the following vendors produce IP-DECT systems:

- Aastra (DeTeWe)
- Ascom (company)
- Gigaset
- Mitel
- NEC
- Panasonic
- Spectralink 7000 series (Polycom, Kirk)
- Alcatel-Lucent
- Ericsson-LG

== See also ==
- CAT-iq
- Voice over WLAN
