= Residential gateway =

Device connecting users to the Internet

A residential gateway is a small consumer-grade gateway which bridges network access between connected local area network (LAN) hosts to a wide area network (WAN) (such as the Internet) via a modem, or directly connects to a WAN (as in EttH), while routing. The WAN is a larger computer network, generally operated by an Internet service provider.

== History ==
The term residential gateway was popularized by Clifford Holliday in 1997 through his paper entitled "The residential gateway".

== Devices ==
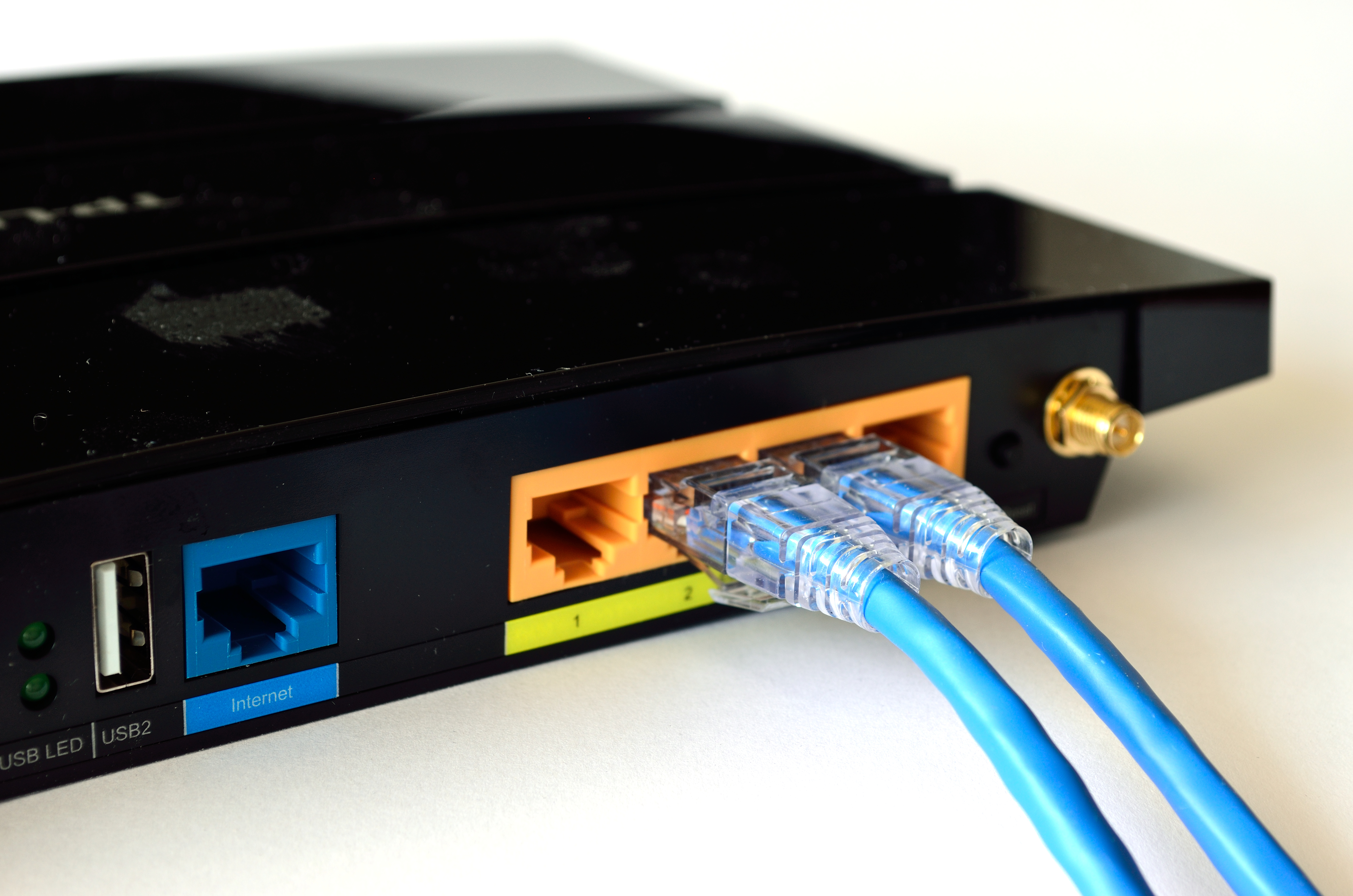
A typical residential gateway. A single internet connection is shared by multiple devices connected through a LAN.

Multiple devices have been described as residential gateways:

- Cable modem
- DSL modem
- FTTx modem
- IP-DECT telephone (base station)
- Network switch
- Smart home hub
- TV/VoD set-top box
- Voice over Internet protocol (VoIP) analog telephone adapter
- Wired router
- Wireless access point
- Wireless router

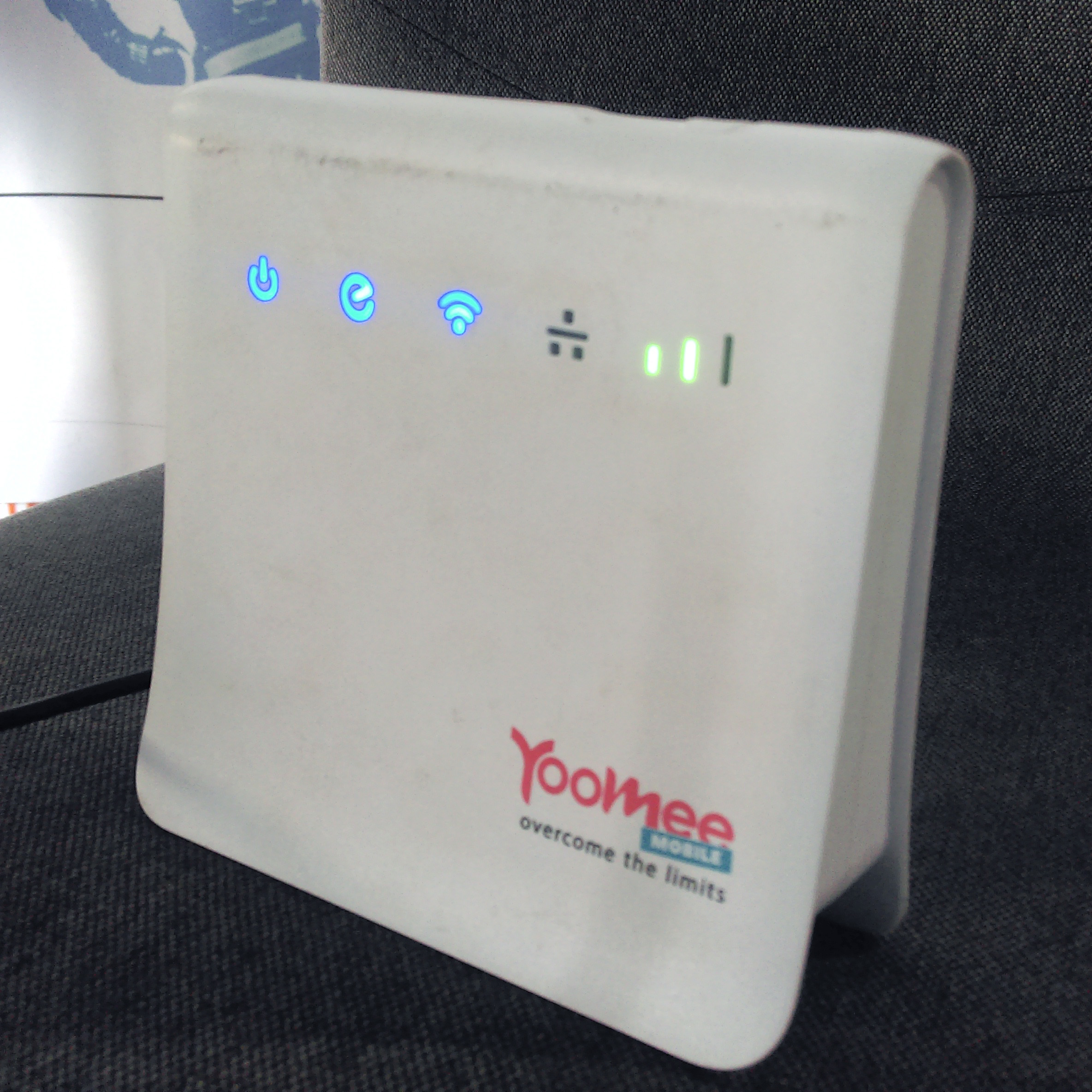
An internet box integrating a SIM Card

A modem (e.g. DSL modem, cable modem) by itself provides none of the functions of a router. It merely allows ATM or PPP or PPPoE traffic to be transmitted across telephone lines, cable wires, optical fibers, wireless radio frequencies, or other physical layers. On the receiving end is another modem that re-converts the transmission format back into digital data packets. This allows network bridging using telephone, cable, optical, and radio connection methods. The modem also provides handshake protocols, so that the devices on each end of the connection are able to recognize each other. However, a modem generally provides few other network functions.

- A USB modem plugs into a single PC and allows a connection of that single PC to a WAN. If properly configured, the PC can also function as the router for a home LAN.
- An internal modem can be installed on a single PC (e.g. on a PCI card), also allowing that single PC to connect to a WAN. Again, the PC can be configured to function as a router for a home LAN.

A cellular wireless access point can function in a similar fashion to a modem. It can allow a direct connection from a home LAN to a WWAN, if a wireless router or access point is present on the WAN as well and tethering is allowed.

Many modems now incorporate the features mentioned below and thus are appropriately described as residential gateways, such as some Internet providers which offer a cable modem router combo.

== Features ==
A residential gateway usually provides

- configuration via a web interface, or app on mobile device.
- routing between the home network and the Internet.
- connectivity within the home network like a network switch, hub, or WLAN base station.
- network address translation (NAT),
- DHCP for IPv4 and IPv6, and
- firewall functions

It may also provide other functions such as Dynamic DNS, and converged triple play services such as TV and telephony.

Most gateways are self-contained components, using internally stored firmware. They are generally platform-independent, i.e., they can serve any operating system.

Wireless routers perform the same functions as a wired router and base station, but allow connectivity for wireless devices with the LAN, or as a bridge between the wireless router and another wireless router for a meshnet (the wireless router-wireless router connection can be within the LAN or can be between the LAN and WWAN).

== Security ==
Low-cost production and requirement for user friendliness make gateways vulnerable to network attacks, which resulted in large clusters of such devices being taken over and used to launch DDoS attacks. A majority of the vulnerabilities were present in the web administration frontends of the routers, allowing unauthorized control either via default passwords, vendor backdoors, or web vulnerabilities.

== See also ==
- Customer-premises equipment
- Home network
- Home server
- LAN switching
- List of router firmware projects
- Multimedia over Coax Alliance
- Technological convergence
