= CAT-iq =

Technology initiative

Cordless Advanced Technology—internet and quality (CAT-iq) is a technology initiative from the Digital Enhanced Cordless Telecommunications (DECT) Forum, based on ETSI TS 102 527 New Generation DECT (NG-DECT) European standard series.

NG-DECT contains backward compatible extensions to basic DECT GAP (Generic access profile) functionality which allow bases and handsets from different vendors to work together with full feature richness expected from SIP terminals and VoIP gateways.

CAT-iq defines several profiles for high quality wideband voice services with multiple lines, as well as low bit-rate data applications.

== Profiles ==
The CAT-iq profiles are split between voice and data service, with the following mandatory features:

CAT-iq 1.0 "HD Voice" (ETSI TS 102 527-1)
Narrow-band (32 kbit/s G.726 ADPCM) and wideband (64 kbit/s G.722 sub-band ADPCM) audio, calling party line and name identification (CLIP, CNAP)
CAT-iq 2.0 "Multi Line" (ETSI TS 102 527-3)
Adds multiple lines, line name/id, call waiting, call transfer, phonebook, missed calls list, DTMF signalling, hands-free headset, handset locator, synchronisation of call lists, phonebook, and settings
CAT-iq 2.1 "Green" (ETSI TS 102 527-5)
Adds 3-party conference, call intrusion, caller blocking (CLIR), answering machine control, SMS on handsets, power-saving modes for handset and base
CAT-iq Data (ETSI TS 102 527-4)
Light data services and software upgrade over the air (SUOTA). Previously CAT-iq 3.0 "Internet Ready"
CAT-iq IOT (ETSI TS 102 939)
Smart Home connectivity (IOT) using DECT Ultra Low Energy on base. Previously CAT-iq 4.0 "Intelligent Networking"

The CAT-iq profiles require a stricter set of mandatory features than the relevant ETSI NG-DECT standards, which make many advanced features optional.

Optional voice codecs include 64 kbit/s G.711 μ-law/A-law PCM (narrow band), 32 kbit/s G.729.1 (wideband), 32 kbit/s MPEG-4 ER AAC-LD (wideband), and 64 kbit/s MPEG-4 ER AAC-LD (super-wideband).

Within the voice profiles, the revisions are sequential: CAT-iq 1.0 provides basic wideband voice, while CAT-iq 2.0 and 2.1 add new functions which expand and supersede parts of the lower profiles.

The Data and IOT profiles can either be considered in isolation for data only devices or as a complementary service to the voice enabled devices.

== Interoperability ==
CAT-iq allows IP-DECT gateways with integrated NG-DECT base stations operate in full-feature mode with any certified CAT-iq 2.0/2.1 handset, regardless of different vendors and silicon or software protocol stack implementations. The base stations will also work with GAP handsets, though supporting only the basic GAP features.

The DECT Forum maintains CAT-iq 2.0 Certification program, which opened in December 2010 for member companies. Certification ensures feature compatibility between devices from different vendors with specific focus on the over-the-air protocol, RF emissions and wideband audio requirements. Certified products are allowed to carry the CAT-iq logo and the HD Voice logo from the GSM Association.

== See also ==
- DECT (Digital Enhanced Cordless Telecommunications)
- Wideband audio

== Standards ==
ETSI TS 102 527. Digital Enhanced Cordless Telecommunications (DECT) – New Generation DECT

- "ETSI TS 102 527-1 V1.5.1 (2019-08). Part 1: Wideband speech" (PDF).
- "ETSI TS 102 527-2 V1.1.1 (2007-06). Part 2: Support of transparent IP packet data" (PDF).
- "ETSI TS 102 527-3 V1.7.1 (2019-08). Part 3: Extended wideband speech services" (PDF).
- "ETSI TS 102 527-4 V1.3.1 (2015-11). Part 4: Light Data Services; Software Update Over The Air (SUOTA), content downloading and HTTP based applications" (PDF).
- "ETSI TS 102 527-5 V1.3.1 (2019-08). Part 5: Additional feature set nr. 1 for extended wideband speech services" (PDF).

Digital Enhanced Cordless Telecommunications (DECT) – New Generation DECT

- "ETSI TS 102 841 V1.5.1 (2014-01). Extended wideband speech services – Profile Test Specification (PTS) and Test Case Library (TCL)" (PDF).
- "ETSI TS 102 843 V1.2.1 (2022-08). Additional feature set nr.1 for extended wideband speech services; Profile Test Specification (PTS) and Test Case Library (TCL)" (PDF).
- "ETSI TS 103 158 V1.1.1 (2014-11). Light Data Services – Software Update Over The Air (SUOTA) – Profile Test Specification (PTS) and Test Case Library (TCL)" (PDF).

Digital Enhanced Cordless Telecommunications (DECT)

- "ETSI TR 102 570 V1.1.1 (2007-03). Digital Enhanced Cordless Telecommunications (DECT); New Generation DECT; Overview and Requirements" (PDF).
