= Home Gateway Initiative =

Nonprofit trade organization

The Home Gateway Initiative (HGI) was a nonprofit trade organization to discuss the key specifications and standards of residential gateways, also known as home gateways.

It was founded by telephone companies (Belgacom, BT, Deutsche Telekom, France Telecom, KPN, Nippon Telegraph and Telephone (NTT), Swiss Telecom, Telenor, Telecom Italia and Teliasonera) in December 2004.

Several manufacturers such as ADB, Devolo, Huawei, Ikanos Communications, Intel, Lantiq, SoftAtHome or ZTE also joined the alliance. HGI's aims included:

- Release specifications of the home gateway.
- Boost the market of home communication services to the millions of customers served by its founding members.
- Improve the interoperability of gateways with home devices.

HGI also built on work of other standards bodies such as the Broadband Forum, Digital Living Network Alliance (DLNA) and Open Services Gateway initiative (OSGi) Alliance. The initiative made an agreement with the Telecommunication Standardization Sector of the International Telecommunication Union (ITU-T) in 2006. HGI established relations with oneM2M and initiated a transfer of HGI work into oneM2M, especially regarding a Smart Device Template (SDT) specification which was transferred as ETSI TR 118 522 V2.0.0 (2016-09)

HGI closed operations in June 2016, wrapping up according to its statutes, and archiving all specifications for five years. The HGI website and documents were permanently archived on www.archive.org on 21 February 2021. The organisation webpage www.homegatewayinitiative.org is no longer owned and might potentially be taken over by some other organisation in future.
