= Cordless telephone =

Portable telephone that connects to a landline

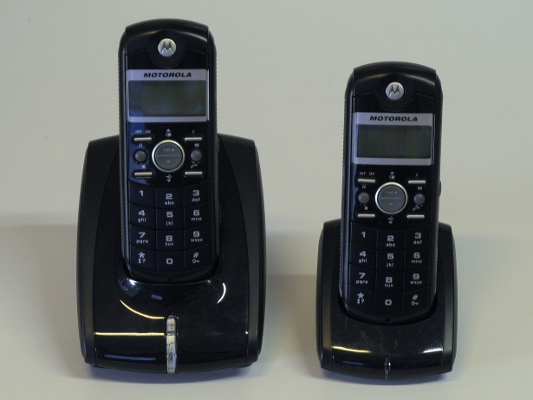
Two cordless telephones

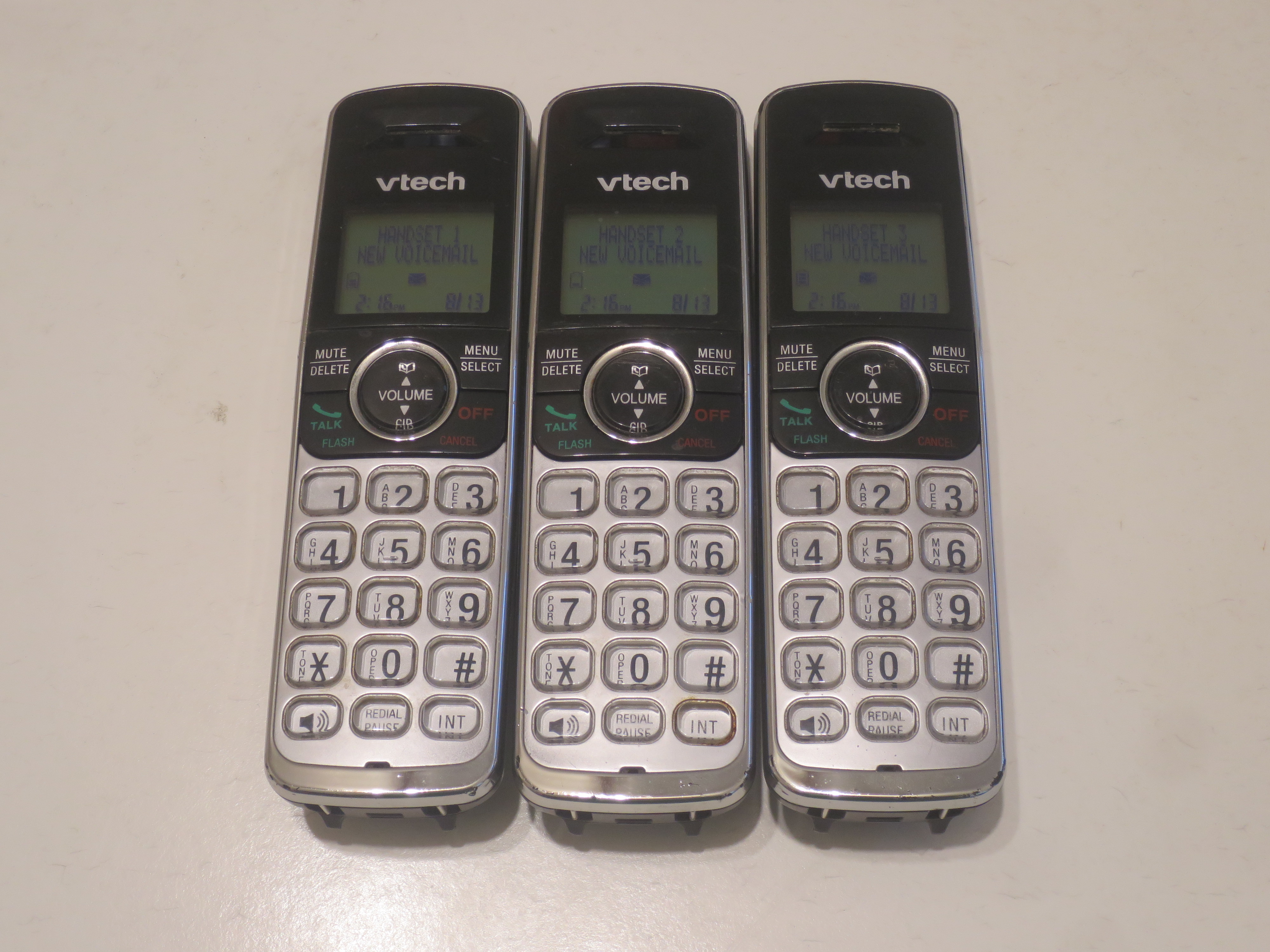
3 VTech cordless landline phones

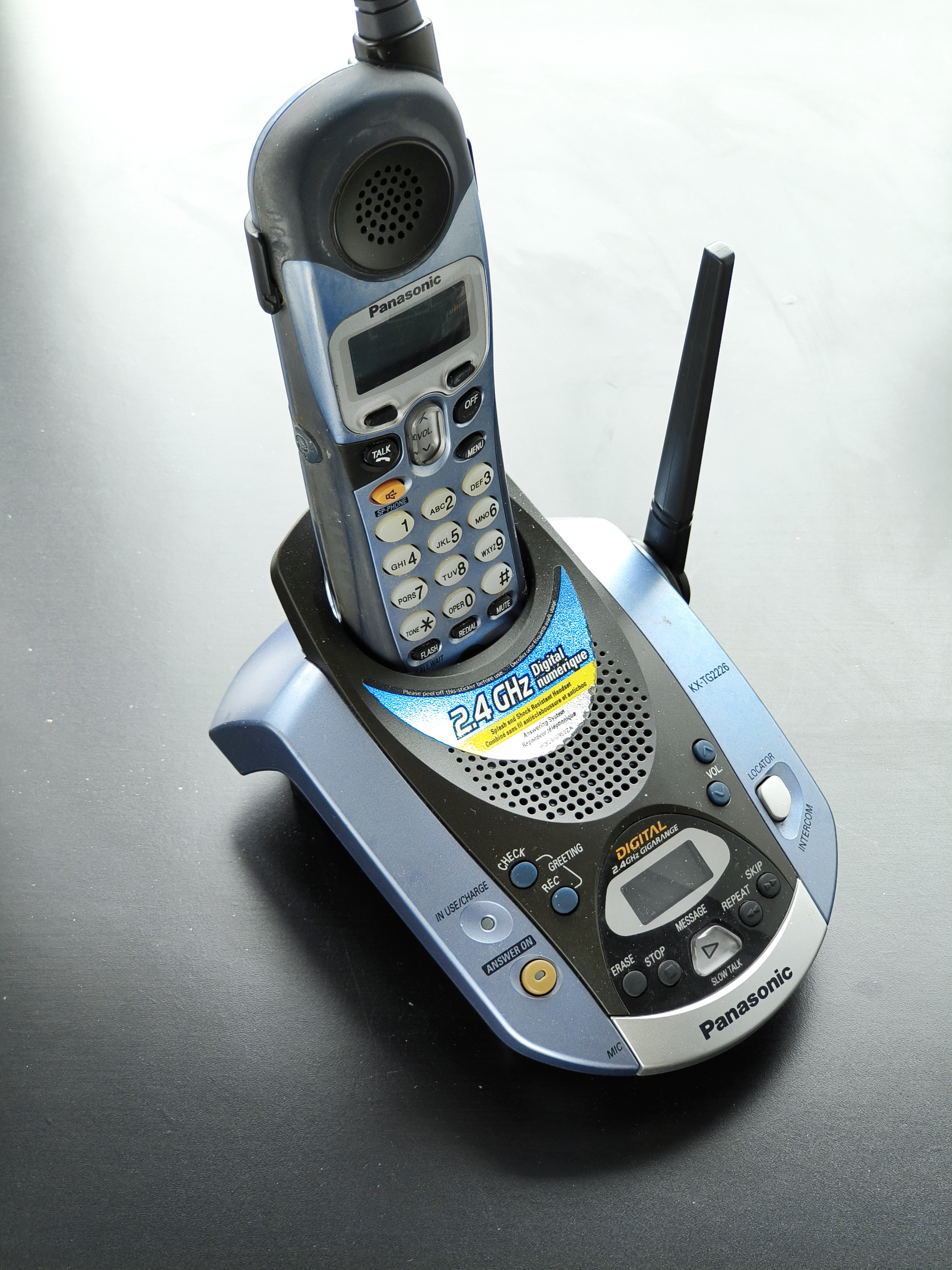
A Panasonic KX-TG2226B 2.4GHz cordless phone with answering machine

A cordless telephone or portable telephone is a portable telephone handset that connects by radio to a base station connected to the public telephone network. The operational range is limited, usually to the same building or within some short distance from the base station.

A cordless telephone differs functionally from a mobile phone in its limited range and by depending on the base station on the subscriber premises. Current cordless telephone standards, such as PHS and DECT, have blurred the once clear-cut line between cordless and mobile telephones by implementing cell handoff (handover); various advanced features, such as data-transfer; and even, on a limited scale, international roaming. In specialized models, a commercial mobile network operator may maintain base stations and users subscribe to the service.

Unlike a corded telephone, a cordless telephone needs mains electricity (to power the base station). The cordless handset contains a rechargeable battery, which the base station re-charges when the handset rests in its cradle.

== History ==
Radio telephony (telephony without wires) predated cordless phones by at least two decades. The first, MTS, or Mobile Telephone Service went into service in 1946. Because the range was intended to cover the widest possible service area, capacity was extremely low, and the early tube technology made equipment rather large and heavy. The second generation radio telephone, or IMTS, or Improved Mobile Telephone Service became active in 1964.

Beginning in 1963, a small team of Bell Laboratories engineers were tasked with developing a practical and fully functional duplex wireless telephone. The team included (in alphabetic order): S.M. Baer, G.C. Balzer, J.M. Brown, W.F. Clemency, M. Rosenthal, and W. Zinsmeister, under the direction of W.D. Goodale, Jr.

By 1964, breadboard models were working in the lab. During 1964-65 these were refined and packaged to test around the Bell Labs Holmdel N.J. facilities. The system operated under an experimental license on crystal controlled channels in the 35 and 43 MHz bands using FM, a low power transmitter and a sensitive superhet receiver. Full supervision of all telephone functions, including on-off hook and dialing was provided via an out of band tone supervision system. The model developed for home use was designed to look like a standard (although bulky) telephone handset. The base station was a small box connected to a standard telephone network. About 50 units were built in a Western Electric model shop in Andover for field trials in two Bell System locations in the Boston and Phoenix area. The overall project was described in the Bell Laboratories Record, Volume 45 (1967).

In 1966, George Sweigert submitted a patent application for a "full duplex wireless communications apparatus". He was awarded U.S. patent 3,449,750 in June 1969. Sweigert, a radio operator in World War II stationed at the South Pacific Islands of Guadalcanal and Bougainville, developed the full duplex concept for untrained personnel, to improve battlefield communications for senior commanders.

Sweigert was an active proponent for directly coupling consumer electronics to the AT&T-owned telephone lines in the late 1960s. The telephone companies at the time did not permit third-party equipment to be connected to their lines; most telephones were made by Western Electric and leased to the customer by AT&T. The Carterfone coupler, a crude device for interconnecting a two-way radio with the telephone, led to the reversal of the Federal Communications Commission ban on direct coupling of consumer equipment to phone lines (known as the landmark Carterfone decision) on June 26, 1968. The original cordless phones, like the Carterfone, were acoustically (not electrically) connected to the public telephone network.

In 1977, Douglas G. Talley and L. Duane Gregory were granted U.S. patent 4,039,760 for a duplex voice communication link including controls provided between a base station connected directly to a telephone line of a telephone exchange and a mobile unit consisting of a small, compact cordless telephone instrument containing transmitter, receiver and control circuits powered by a rechargeable battery pack. A single logic tone is transmitted and detected for all logical control for ring signals, on-hook and off-hook signals and dial pulses.

Cordless phones became widely used in home and workplaces during the early 1980s. According to The New York Times, the number of cordless phones sold in the United States grew from 50,000 in 1980 to 1 million in 1982. They quickly became popular because of their convenience and portability, despite fears that their reliance on radio signals would make them vulnerable to eavesdropping or other malfeasance.

In 1994, digital cordless phones in the 900 MHz frequency range became available to consumers. These new types of phones provided better audio quality because they could filter out interference and their signals could penetrate walls more easily. Digital signals allowed the phones to be more secure and decreased eavesdropping; it was relatively easy to eavesdrop on analog cordless phone conversations. In 1995 digital spread spectrum (DSS) was introduced for cordless phones. This technology enabled the spreading of the digital voice transmission over multiple frequencies, improving privacy and reducing interference between different subscribers.

== Frequencies ==
=== United States ===
In the United States, seven frequency bands have been allocated by the Federal Communications Commission for uses that include cordless phones. These are:

- 1.7 MHz (1.665–1.770 MHz, narrow-band FM) Cordless phones manufactured after October 1, 1984, are not allowed to use this band and were required to use the newer (higher) 43-50 MHz frequencies, although older telephones, on the older frequency pairs, could still be used.
- 27 MHz, near the Citizens Band (CB) Radio service with some frequencies being 26.010, 26.050, 26.380, 26.419 and 27.095 MHz. These were initially paired with the 1.7 MHz frequencies, then, later, with the 49 MHz frequencies. Signals were FM - frequency modulation.
- 43–50 MHz (Base: 43.72–46.97 MHz, Handset: 48.76–49.99 MHz, FM) Allocated in December 1983, and approved for use in mid-1984 for 10 channels. 15 additional channels allocated April 5, 1995.
- 900 MHz (902–928 MHz, allocated in 1993)
- 1.9 GHz (1920–1930 MHz, developed in 1993 and allocated in October 2005, especially with DECT 6.0)
- 2.4 GHz (2400–2500 MHz, allocated in 1998)simplex
- 5.8 GHz (5725–5875 MHz, allocated in 2003 due to crowding on the 2.4 GHz band)

Over-crowding of earlier frequency allocations led users to discontinue using telephone equipment that operated on those frequencies, leaving those bands relatively clear. Radio hobbyists monitor usage of the older equipment with telephone activity in the US AM broadcast band, some 27 MHz frequencies and most older 43-50 MHz frequencies.

1.7 MHz cordless phones were the earliest models available at retailers, and are generally identifiable by their large metal telescoping antennas. Channels just above the AM broadcast band were selected manually by the user. Some of the frequencies used are now part of the expanded AM radio band, and can be heard by anyone with an AM radio. There are reports of people still using these phones, and using them as makeshift AM radio stations that can be heard for a couple of city blocks. These models became obsolete because they are susceptible to eavesdropping, and interference from fluorescent lighting and automobile ignition systems. However, under ideal conditions they could have 0.5 miles (0.80 km) or more range.

43–50 MHz cordless phones had a large installed base by the early 1990s, and featured shorter flexible antennas and automatic channel selection. Due to their popularity, an overcrowding of the band led to an allocation of additional frequencies; thus manufacturers were able to sell models with 25 channels instead of just 10 channels. Although less susceptible to interference than previous AM units, these models are no longer in production and are considered obsolete because their frequencies are easily heard on practically any radio scanner. Advanced models began to use voice inversion as a basic form of scrambling to help limit unauthorized eavesdropping. These phones share the 49.8 MHz band (49.830 - 49.890) with some wireless baby monitors.

900 MHz cordless phones are rarely sold but have a huge installed base. Features include even shorter antennas, up to 30 auto selecting channels, and higher resistance to interference. Available in several varieties; analog, analog spread spectrum (100 kHz bandwidth), digital, and digital spread spectrum, most being sold today are low-cost analog models, which are still susceptible to eavesdropping. Digital variants can still be scanned, but are received as a digital hiss and therefore are difficult to eavesdrop upon. Digital transmission is immune to static interference but can experience signal fade (brief silence) as the phone goes out of range of the base. Newer Digital Spread Spectrum (DSS) variants spread their signal over a range of frequencies, providing more resistance to signal fade. This technology enabled the digital information to spread in pieces among several frequencies between the receiver and the base, thereby making it almost impossible to eavesdrop on the cordless conversation. The FCC only allows DSS model phones to transmit at the full power of 1 watt, which allows increased range over older analog and digital models.

Virtually all new cordless phones sold in the US use DECT 6.0 on the 1.9 GHz band, though legacy phones can remain in use on the older 900 MHz, 2.4 GHz and 5.8 GHz bands. There is no specific requirement for any particular transmission mode on the older bands, but in practice many legacy phones also have digital features such as DSSS and FHSS.

Some cordless phones formerly advertised as 5.8 GHz actually transmit from base to phone on 5.8 GHz and transmit from phone to base on 2.4 GHz or 900 MHz, to conserve battery life.

The 1.9 GHz band is used by the DECT 6.0 phone standard and is considered more secure than the other shared frequencies. The vast majority of new cordless phone devices sold in North America, whether connected by landline or to mobile phones (usually via Bluetooth), now use DECT 6.0. However, DECT 6.0's late start compared to DECT elsewhere has led to a large installed base of legacy cordless phones using other frequencies, many of which remain in use today despite increasingly common interference with the ever growing use of Wi-Fi, Bluetooth and other unlicensed digital radio standards, especially at 2.4 GHz and 5.8 GHz.

=== Outside the United States ===
In Europe, the 1.9 GHz (1880–1900 MHz) band was set aside for the DECT phone standard from its inception. DECT, on its European band & related frequencies, has largely displaced all other cordless phone standards worldwide except for North America.

== Performance ==
Many cordless phones in the 21st century are digital. Digital technology has helped provide clear sound and limit casual eavesdropping. Many cordless phones have one main base station and can add up to three or four additional bases. This allows for multiple voice channels that allow three-way conference calls between the bases. This technology also allows multiple handsets to be used at the same time, and up to two handsets can have separate conversations with outside parties.

Manufacturers usually advertise that their higher frequency systems improve audio quality and range. In the ideal case, higher frequencies actually have worse signal propagation as shown by the basic Friis transmission equation, and path loss tends to increase at higher frequencies as well. Practical influences on quality and range are signal strength, antenna quality, the method of modulation used, and interference, which varies locally.

"Plain old telephone service" (POTS) landlines are designed to transfer audio with a quality that is just adequate for the parties to understand each other. Typical bandwidth is 3.6 kHz; only a fraction of the frequencies that humans can hear, but enough to make the voice intelligible. No phone handset can improve on this quality, as it is a limitation of the phone system itself. Higher-quality phones can transfer this signal to the handset with less interference over a greater range, however. Most cordless telephones, no matter what frequency band or transmission method is used, will hardly ever exactly match the sound quality of a high-quality wired telephone attached to a good telephone line. This limitation is caused by a number of issues, including the following:

- Sidetone: hearing one's own voice echoed in the receiver speaker
- A noticeable amount of constant background noise (this is not interference from outside sources, but noise within the cordless telephone system)
- Frequency response not being the full frequency response available in a wired landline telephone

Most manufacturers claim a range of about 30 metres (98 ft) for their 2.4 GHz and 5.8 GHz systems, but inexpensive models often fall short of this claim.

However, the higher frequency often brings advantages. The 900 MHz and 2.4 GHz band are increasingly being used for a host of other devices, including baby monitor, microwave oven, Bluetooth, and wireless LAN; thus, it is likely that a cordless phone will suffer interference from signals broadcast by those devices, and also may itself generate interference. It is also possible for a cordless phone to interfere with the 802.11a wireless standard, as the 802.11a standard can be configured to operate in the 5.8 GHz range. However, this can easily be fixed by reconfiguring the wireless LAN device to work in the 5.180 GHz to 5.320 GHz band.

The newer 1.9 GHz band is reserved for use by phones that use the DECT standard, which should avoid interference issues in the unlicensed 900 MHz, 2.4 GHz, and 5.8 GHz bands.

== Security ==
Many analog phone signals are easily picked up by radio scanners, allowing anyone within range to listen in on conversations (though this is illegal in many countries). Though many such analog models are still produced, modern digital technology is available to reduce the risk of eavesdropping. Digital Spread Spectrum (DSS) typically uses frequency hopping to spread the audio signal (with a 3 kHz bandwidth) over a much wider range of frequencies in a pseudorandom way. Spreading the signal out over a wider bandwidth is a form of redundancy, and increases the signal-to-noise ratio, yielding longer range and less susceptibility to interference. Higher frequency bands provide more room for these wide-bandwidth signals.

To an analog receiver like a scanner, a DSS signal sounds like bursts of noise. Only the base unit using a matching pseudorandom number can decode the signal, and it chooses from one of thousands of such unique codes each time the handset is returned to the cradle. Additionally, the digital nature of the signal increases its tolerance to noise, and some systems even encrypt the digital signal for additional security.

== Cordless phone handsets ==
Roaming cordless phone handsets exist which are not tethered to any particular base station, but which also do not use traditional mobile (cellular) phone networks. These most commonly use digital technologies like DECT, 2.4 GHz unlicensed spectrum, or 802.11a/b/g standards-based wireless LAN technology. Analog equivalents do exist and can provide longer reach, but with potential loss of confidentiality and voice quality. The cordless phone handset connects to a wireless access point or base station that supports the same technology. Also required is a call management function and a gateway to the public switched telephone network (PSTN). This may or may not be integrated in the base-station. A Voice over IP service can be used by phones that use wireless data access points, thus using a broadband Internet connection to defer the connection to the PSTN to a remote gateway operated by the service provider.

== Health and safety ==
Unlike wired telephones that are powered from the telephone company's central station batteries, a cordless phone base station required electrical power to operate. During a power interruption, the cordless base station will not be operable, while wired sets may continue to operate.

== See also ==
- Carterfone
- Fixed-Mobile Convergence Alliance
- Personal Handy-phone System (PHS) in Japan and China
- Spread spectrum
