= Hoeft & Wessel AG =

German IT company

Hoeft & Wessel AG, Hanover, established by the entrepreneurs Michael Hoeft and Rolf Wessel in 1978, is a German IT hardware and software specialist focusing on public transport, parking as well as retail and logistics. It has been listed on the stock market since 1998.

In May 2015, Hoeft & Wessel AG changed its name to METRIC mobility solutions AG.

== Products ==
- Hoeft & Wessel is a provider of ticketing and telematics systems for public transport and check-in terminals for the airline industry.
- With its Skeye product brand Hoeft & Wessel is a manufacturer of the Skeye mobile terminals and system solutions for retail and logistics as well as point of sale systems.
