= TR-196 =

Technical specification of Femto Access Point

TR-196 (Technical Report 196) is a Broadband Forum technical specification. Its official title is "Femto Access Point Service Data Model." The purpose of this Technical Report is to specify the Data Model for the Femto Access Point (FAP) for remote management purposes using the TR-069 CWMP.

FAP is a generic terminology that implies any Radio Access Technology (RAT). In 3GPP's terminology, Home Node B is the name for 3G (UMTS) and Home eNode B for LTE.

== Details ==
There are two major releases ("Issue" in BBF terminology) of TR-196 data model. Issue 1 is the first publication which supports UMTS HNB only. It was later expanded to include LTE HeNB and CDMA2000 FAP, and was released as Issue 2.

TR-196 Release	3GPP Release alignment	UMTS	LTE	CDMA2000
Issue1 (published in April 2009)	Release 8	Supported	Not supported	Not supported
Issue2 (published in November 2011)	Release 9	Supported	Supported	Supported

TR-196 is a specification of Broadband Forum (BBF). But its work is closely related to 3GPP's work on HNB and HeNB, and 3GPP2's work on femtocell. In turn, 3GPP and 3GPP2's work were originally driven by the activities in Femto Forum (now called Small Cell Forum).

Most of the work for the first publication of TR-196 was done within Femto Forum. The work was later submitted to 3GPP SA WG5 to standardize it as respective Technical Specifications (TS). It led to the collaboration between 3GPP and Broadband Forum to officially publish it as BBF Data Model called TR-196.

== History ==
When Femto Forum (current Small Cell Forum) was launched in 2007, one of the main issues in the Femtocell industry was the lack of standardized femtocell architecture, including the standardized O&M framework. In order to avoid the fragmentation in the market, Femto Forum initially focused on these areas. As the Forum reached consensus, the leading companies brought the joint proposal to 3GPP to standardize the HNB architecture.

The standardization in the signalling (Control Plane) architecture later resulted in Iu-h interface in 3GPP. It includes the specification of signalling protocol Home Node B Application Part (HNBAP) and RANAP User Adaptation (RUA). The Data Model was subsequently published by Broadband Forum as TR-196 Issue 1 (Femto Access Point Service Data Model). It is based on Broadband Forum's TR-069 CWMP as the signalling protocol.

=== Publication of Issue 1 ===
In the second half of 2008, Femto Forum reached agreement on O&M framework to be based on Broadband Forum's TR-069 CWMP as the signalling protocol. This followed the Forum's O&M subgroup to start the HNB Data Model work. It included the definition of object organization and parameters, including the detail XML editing work.

At the same time, leading companies proposed a new Work Item (WI) in 3GPP SA WG5 (SA5) for the specification of HNB Data Model ("Information Model" in SA5's terminology). It resulted in the WI "UTRA HNB: 3G Home NodeB OAM&P Type 1 Management Interface." It is worth noting that it was the first time that 3GPP SA5 created specification for Type 1 interface (management interface between Element Manager (EM) and Network Element (NE)). Up to this point, Type 1 interface has been vendor implementation specific only.

The specification work in 3GPP SA5 results in the following set of Technical Specifications (TS):

- TS 32.581 Operations, Administration, Maintenance and Provisioning (OAM&P); Concepts and requirements for Type 1 interface HNB to HNB Management System (HMS)
- TS 32.582 Home Node B (HNB) Operations, Administration, Maintenance and Provisioning (OAM&P); Information model for Type 1 interface HNB to HNB Management System (HMS)
- TS 32.583 Home Node B (HNB) Operations, Administration, Maintenance and Provisioning (OAM&P); Procedure flows for Type 1 interface HNB to HNB Management System (HMS)
- TS 32.584 Home Node B (HNB) Operations, Administration, Maintenance and Provisioning (OAM&P); XML definitions for Type 1 interface HNB to HNB Management System (HMS)

The second TS (TS 32.582) defines the "Information Model" for HNB. During the specification work, it was decided that the Data Model itself is to be owned and published by the Broadband Forum (BBF) rather than 3GPP SA5 to have the ownership of it. This agreement led to the collaboration between 3GPP SA5 and BBF. Then BBF subsequently published the Data Model as the BBF specification TR-196 Issue 1.

=== Publication of Issue 2 ===
After the completion of 3GPP Release 8, a group of companies proposed a new WI "Enhanced Home NodeB / eNodeB: 3G HNB and LTE HeNB OAM&P Type 1 Interface" to define Data Model for LTE Home eNode B. This work in 3GPP SA5 resulted in the following set of Technical Specifications (TS):

- TS 32.591 Telecommunication management; Home enhanced Node B (HeNB) Operations, Administration, Maintenance and Provisioning (OAM&P); Concepts and requirements for Type 1 interface HeNB to HeNB Management System (HeMS)
- TS 32.592 Telecommunication management; Home enhanced Node B (HeNB) Operations, Administration, Maintenance and Provisioning (OAM&P); Information model for Type 1 interface HeNB to HeNB Management System (HeMS)
- TS 32.593 Telecommunication management; Home enhanced Node B (HeNB) Operations, Administration, Maintenance and Provisioning (OAM&P); Procedure flows for Type 1 interface HeNB to HeNB Management System (HeMS)
- TS 32.594 Telecommunication management; Home enhanced Node B (HeNB) Operations, Administration, Maintenance and Provisioning (OAM&P); XML definitions for Type 1 interface HeNB to HeNB Management System (HeMS)

The second TS (TS 32.592) defines the "Information Model" for HeNB. This time, all detail work including object / parameter definitions and the detail XML editing work was done by 3GPP SA5. The reality was that the same set of small group of core people did much of the work in both Issue 1 and Issue 2. Based on the collaboration framework that was established between 3GPP SA5 and BBF at the time of publication of Issue 1, the former liaised with BBF to publish the new Data Model.

At the same time, 3GPP2 established similar collaboration framework with BBF to standardize the CDMA2000 FAP Data Model. BBF took inputs from both 3GPP and 3GPP2, merged them into a single Data Model.

At this time BBF saw that there are some issues with the resulting Data Model and saw the need to re-organize it. This includes extracting commonly used objects and parameters, and aligning other existing BBF Data Models. This resulted in moving some parts of the objects / parameters in original Issue 1 to another BBF Data Model, creating a separate Data Model specification, and re-organizing some of the existing object / parameter structure and definition. As a result, Issue 2 became non-backward compatible with Issue 1.

== Relationship Between 3GPP Specification and BBF TR-196 ==
Issue 1 defines Data Model for UMTS HNB only. Therefore, Issue 1 content aligns with 3GPP TS 32.582 (TS 32.582 is a high-level definition of objects and parameters only).

Issue 2 expands Issue 1 by including LTE HeNB and 3GPP2's FAP Data Model. UMTS HNB part still aligns with 3GPP TS 32.582. In addition, LTE HeNB part aligns 1-to-1 with 3GPP TS 32.592.

== Issue with Migrating from Issue 1 to Issue 2 Data Model ==
As discussed in the earlier section on the historical background of Issue 2, Issue 2 is not backward-compatible with Issue 1 Data Model. This implies that migrating from Issue 1 to Issue 2 requires complete change in the Data Model support and implementation in the software. This can potentially lead to migration issue in commercial deployment.

== Related Standard ==
- 3GPP TS 32.582 Home Node B (HNB) Operations, Administration, Maintenance and Provisioning (OAM&P); Information model for Type 1 interface HNB to HNB Management System (HMS)
- 3GPP TS 32.592 Telecommunication management; Home enhanced Node B (HeNB) Operations, Administration, Maintenance and Provisioning (OAM&P); Information model for Type 1 interface HeNB to HeNB Management System (HeMS)

== See also ==
- Home Node B - 3G (UMTS) version of Femto Access Point (FAP)
- Home eNode B - LTE version of Femto Access Point (FAP)
- TR-069 - Broadband Forum CPE WAN Management Protocol (CWMP)
