= Ip.access =

Multinational technology company

ip.access Limited
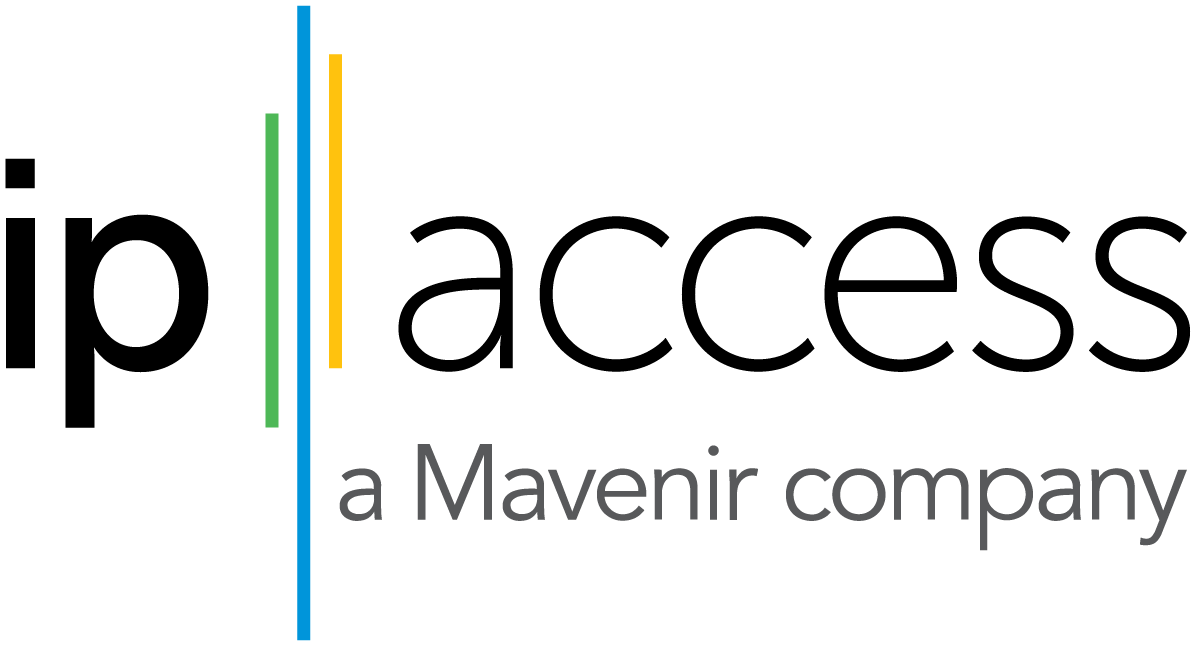
- Type: Subsidiary
- Founded: 1 January 2000
- Headquarters: Cambourne, Cambridge, United Kingdom
- Area served: Worldwide
- Key people: Aniruddho Basu (SVP and GM); Richard Staveley (CEO)
- Parent: Mavenir (since 2020)
- Website: ipaccess.com

ip.access Limited is a multinational corporation that designs, manufactures, and markets small cells (picocell and femtocell) technologies and infrastructure equipment for GSM, GPRS, EDGE, 3G, 4G and 5G. The company was acquired by Mavenir in September 2020.

The company’s headquarters is based in Cambourne, England. The company also maintains offices in Gurgaon and Pune, India.

ip.access combines IP and cellular technologies to provide 2G, 3G and LTE coverage and for mobile networks. Using satellite backhaul, its products provide coverage to commercial passenger aircraft, ships, and users in remote rural areas.

The firm is a member of 3GPP, CBRS Alliance, European Telecommunications Standards Institute (ETSI), Having previously been an individual member of the Telecom Infra Project, following its acquisition, ip.access continues to be involved through Mavenir's membership.

== History ==
ip.access was founded in December 1999 as a wholly owned subsidiary of TTP Group PLC aimed at developing technologies that would allow multiple radio access technologies to communicate over the Internet. To accommodate its growing staff, in 2006 ip.access relocated to new offices in Cambourne Business Park, Cambridge, where it remains.

In October 2000, TTP Group spun off its communications division (TTP Communications, or TTPCom) in an initial public offering on the London Stock Exchange, and ip.access joined the spin-off as a wholly owned subsidiary of the TTPCom group.

In March 2006, the company secured an £8.5 million round of funding from Intel Capital, Scottish Equity Partners, and Rothschild & Cie Banque. As part of its June 2006 acquisition of TTP Communications, Motorola also gained a stake in ip.access. In 2007, after signing an OEM agreement with ip.access, ADC (now part of Tyco Electronics) made a minority interest investment in the company. Followed by, both Cisco Systems and Qualcomm making strategic financial investments in the company in 2008.

In July 2007, the firm became a founding member of the Femto Forum, renamed Small Cell Forum in February 2012. ip.access was named in The Sunday Times Fast Tech Track 100 in both 2007 and 2008. The company was cited as the number one picocell vendor by ABI Research in 2008.

In 2009, ip.access was named in the Deloitte Technology Fast 500 EMEA. In April 2009, the company announced its Oyster 3G product would support femtocell standards published by 3GPP and the Broadband Forum. In March 2010, the company took part in the first Plugfest, organized by ETSI as part of its Plugtests program, held to demonstrate the effectiveness of the 3GPP femtocell standards in supporting interoperability between femtocell access points and network equipment from different vendors.

In June 2011, the market research and analysis firm Infonetics named ip.access along with its partner Cisco Systems, as the leading supplier of 3G femtocells. In August 2011, ip.access announced it had made more than 500,000 installations of its 3G technologies. In February 2013, ip.access announced it had become the first 3G small cell provider to ship one million residential units. In the same month, ip.access and iDirect completed successful interoperability testing of 3G small cells over IP Satellite.

In February 2014, ip.access launched a new range of small cells called presenceCell, which unlike traditional small cells, do not rely on providing indoor coverage and capacity to deliver a return on investment. Rather, the ultra-compact base stations are designed to capture anonymous user location and phone identity information from smartphones, which can be analysed and packaged as a service for a variety of businesses.

Private equity fund Zouk Capital invested in ip.access in July 2015 alongside Amadeus Capital Partners.

In August 2015, ip.access was named as a partner in the European Commission-funded €8 million Horizon 2020 Project SESAME. Led by Hellenic Telecommunications Organisation (OTE) the project's remit was to develop virtualised cloud-enabled, multi-operator, 5G radio access infrastructure and services. In February, 2016. ip.access launched its Viper platform to provide end-to-end connectivity and management for small cells.

nanoVirt, a virtualised small cell gateway which integrates 2G, 3G and 4G small cell management and access control functions and can run on a carrier-grade Virtual Machine (VM) environment or hosted in a third-party data centre was announced in May 2016. Ip.access has deployed more than 2 million small cells globally which are used by mobile operators to densify their networks to improve network coverage and/or capacity. Small cells are also the foundation for private network use cases based on spectrum sharing such as CBRS in the United States.

AeroMobile and SITAONAIR use ip.access small cells combined with satellite backhaul to provide cellular coverage on commercial and private aircraft. The company also supplies maritime solutions on freight vessels and cruise liners working with partners such as Pentonet, SpeedCast and Telecom26. Ip.access has also provided small cells connected over satellite as rapid deployment disaster response systems. Ip.access small cell solution have also been deployed in Africa, Asia, and Latin America to provide connectivity to rural and remote communities and reduce the digital divide.

== Acquisition by Mavenir ==
On September 27, 2020 ip.access was acquired by Mavenir, the supplier of cloud-native network software to communication service providers. The acquisition allowed the integration of ip.access’ 2G and 3G technologies into Mavenir's existing 4G and 5G OpenRAN portfolio broadband suite and also extend its reach into the enterprise market for private wireless networks based on 3GPP technologies such as 4G/LTE and 5G.

The sale of ip.access Ltd to Mavenir was led by the ip.access management team; Richard Staveley (CEO), Nick Johnson (CTO & Founder), Neil Winrow (COO) and Laura Lawrence (CFO).

The two companies had worked together to deliver Vodafone UK's first Open RAN site at the Royal Welsh Showground in Builth Wells in August 2020.

In November 2020, Mavenir announced the establishment of an OpenRAN Centre of Innovation to be centred at the ip.access headquarters in Cambridge, UK.

== Products ==
The telecommunications firms AT&T uses Oyster 3G as the core femtocell technology for its 3G MicroCell product. Cisco Systems, has jointly developed a femtocell solution with ip.access in compliance with the Broadband Forum's TR-069 technical specification.

=== nanoGSM ===
In 2002, ip.access introduced the world's first IP basestation controller for indoor GSM networks. nanoGSM uses 2G picocells that leverage the standard GSM air interface, full IP-based BSC, and an OMC-R management system that delivers voice, messaging and data to both 2G and 3G handsets at an indoor range of up to 200m.

=== nano3G ===
nano3G is an end-to-end femtocell system with access points for Enterprise, E-class [E8, E16 and E24] and Small Medium Business, S-class [S8], access controller and element management system, providing carrier-class coverage to commercial and consumer users.

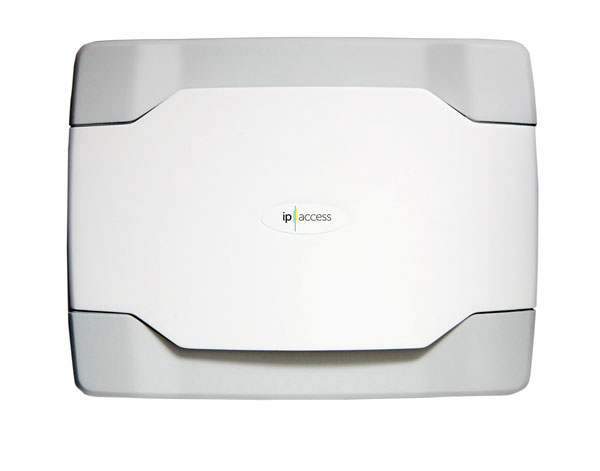
The ip.access nano3G Enterprise

=== Oyster 3G Technology ===
Launched at the 2007 3GSM World Congress in Barcelona, Spain, the Oyster 3G is ip.access' core 3G femtocell technology used by system integrators and OEM customers to integrate WCDMA femtocells into home gateways, set-top boxes, and other devices. ip.access' Oyster 3G is the core technology of AT&T's 3G MicroCell

=== nanoLTE ===
nanoLTE [E-40, E-60, E-100] is an Enterprise grade platform that brings LTE capacity both in-doors and in public spaces, while also offering the option of providing extra 3G infill and Circuit Switch Fall Back (CSFB) capacity.

=== presenceCell ===
Launched in 2014, the presenceCell is a new range of small cell, designed to capture precise user location data via their smart phone, which can be analysed and packaged as a service for a variety of businesses. In addition to the presenceCell, ip.access also provides the back-end processing and management system that delivers the Presence data anonymously and securely to vertical application providers. The company's Network Orchestration System serves as the infrastructure management solution and also supports the GSMA's OneAPI standard, which allows third parties to provide value-added services through web friendly message interfaces. The presenceCell was commercially deployed by Vodafone Turkey in 2015. In January 2017, ip.access entered into a strategic partnership with wireless network analytics company Inovva to enhance the Presence offering.

=== Viper ===
Viper is a virtualised, in-premises enterprise 3G/4G radio access network platform launched in February 2016 that can be deployed by mobile operators or enterprises to offer indoor coverage through a “small cells as a service” (ScaaS) business model. In May 2017, ip.access announced the updating of the Viper2020 Cloud Managed Small Cell platform to support 5G, first responders and neutral host networks with Presence.

=== SoHo Access Point ===
The S-60, announced in February 2016, is ip.access’ first freestanding low-cost 4G/LTE access point designed for small offices and retailers.

=== 4G Access Control Gateway ===
Also launched in February 2016, the 4G Access Control Gateway provides mobile operators with a single interface between their existing core network and LTE small cells.

=== nanoVirt Small Cell Gateway ===
nanoVirt, launched in May 2016, is a software solution that integrates 2G, 3G and 4G small cell management and access control functions as virtualized components that can be deployed by mobile operators and neutral hosts on their preferred Virtual Machine server hardware or third-party data centre.

=== E62 multi-RAT platform ===
Announced in February 2019, the E62 is a multi-Radio Access Technology 3G/4G platform that is software-upgradable to 5G.

=== nanoCBRS ===
nanoCBRS is an OnGo certified solution for the deployment of private LTE networks in the 3.5 GHz band. Launched in October 2019, the solution incorporates Citizens Band Radio Devices, a suite of architectures – nanoViNE - to support use cases and nanoCBRSLab, a mobile network lab solution for testing.

== Customers and Partners ==
Among ip.access' major customers are AT&T, Batelco, Bharti Airtel, Blue Ocean Wireless, Bouygues Telecom, Caribsat, Digicel, Globe, Jersey Telecom Monaco Telecom, O2 (UK), SFR, SPIE SA, T-Mobile, Tele2, Telefónica O2 Czech Republic, Telenet, Telia Sonera, T-Mobile, Vivacom and Vodafone.

The company's technology partners include AeroMobile, Africa Mobile Networks, Altobridge, Blue Ocean Wireless, Cisco Systems, Druid Software, Intel, Pentonet, Private Mobile Networks, Qualcomm, Quortus, Setcom, and TriaGnoSys.

== Awards ==
Corporate, product, and personnel awards won by ip.access include the following:

=== 2007 ===
- Light Reading Leading Lights Awards - Best New Product (Private Company)
- Global Mobile Awards - Best Radio Access Product or Service
- The Sunday Times Fast Tech Track 100
- World Communications Award - Best Technology Foresight

=== 2008 ===
- The Sunday Times Fast Tech Track 100

=== 2009 ===
- Deloitte Fast 500 EMEA
- Femto Forum Awards - Femtocell or Femtocell Network Element Design and Technology Innovation
- Femto Forum Awards - Femtocell Service (Commercial, Prototype, or Demo)
- Global Telecoms Business Innovation Awards - Maritime Voice Services

=== 2010 ===
- GTB Power100
- World Vendor Awards - Best Specialist Vendor

=== 2011 ===
- Femto Forum Awards - Femtocell Network Element Design and Technology Innovation

=== 2012 ===
- World Vendor Awards - Small Cell Award
- Small Cell Forum Industry Awards - Judges Choice Award

=== 2013 ===
- Small Cell Forum Industry Awards - Social Vision, promoting Small Cells for Social / Economical / Environmental development

=== 2014 ===
- Small Cell Forum Industry Awards - Social Impact, promoting small cells for social/economic/environmental development.

=== 2015 ===
- Small Cell Forum Industry Awards - Social Impact, small cells create advanced LTE testbeds for aspiring engineers worldwide.

=== 2016 ===
- Small Cell Forum Industry Awards – Judges Choice for the Viper platform

=== 2017 ===
- Small Cell Forum Industry Awards – Outstanding Innovation in Small Cell Business Case

=== 2018 ===
- Security Essen 2018 – Special Award in the Security Innovation Awards 2018 for Presence

=== 2019 ===
- Small Cell Forum Industry Awards – Excellence in the delivery of Software and Services (4) – Management, automation and orchestration for Private LTE
