= Sentient Networks =

Former American networking hardware company

Sentient Networks, Inc.
- Company type: Private
- Industry: Computer networking
- Founded: 1995; 30 years ago in Sarasota, Florida, United States
- Defunct: 1999; 26 years ago
- Fate: Acquired by Cisco Systems
- Headquarters: San Jose, California, United States
- Number of employees: 102 (1999)
- Website: sentientnet.com at the Wayback Machine (archived 1998-12-06)

Sentient Networks, Inc., was an American networking hardware company that manufactured of Asynchronous Transfer Mode (ATM) and Frame Relay concentrators and switches for central offices. Founded in 1995 in Sarasota, Florida, the company soon after moved to San Jose, California. It was acquired by Cisco Systems in 1999.

== History ==
Sentient Networks was founded in 1995 by Nimish Shah, who previously an employee of Loral Data Systems in Sarasota, Florida, before the latter subsidiary was shut down. He founded Sentient in Tampa Bay, Florida; the company soon saw venture capital backing from companies such as Sequoia Capital Accel Partners, AT&T, and Ameritech. By late 1996, the company employed 35 and had leased a 6,000-square-foot building in Sarasota for its headquarters and a 1,000-square-foot facility in San Jose, California, as a regional office. In September 1996, the company moved its entire operations to a 26,000-square-foot facility in San Jose.

Sentient made products for Internet service providers, interexchange carriers, and Regional Bell Operating Companies. It developed the industry's highest-density ATM Circuit Emulation Service (CES) gateway. The company's first successful product was the Ultimate 1000 network switch, which incorporated the company's new proprietary Any Service/Any Port architecture, allowing individual parts to be configured as ATM or Frame Relay switches. Released in 1996, it was purportedly the first product to comply fully with the ATM Forum's "Anchorage Accord" specification. Sentient negotiated an OEM agreement with DSC Communitations in 1997 for their Ultimate 1000.

Cisco Systems, also of San Jose, announced their intent to acquire on April 8, 1999. Sentient at that point had 102 employees; its CEO was Greg McAdoo. Sentient's employees joined the Multi-Service Switching business unit (MSSBU) of Cisco, which was the part of Cisco created by their acquisition of StrataCom. The acquisition was finalized on June 25, 1999, with Sentient receiving $125 million.
