= Samsung SGH-T319 =

Mobile phone model

- Manufacturer: Samsung
- Series: Samsung SGH-t309
- Availability by region: 2006
- Discontinued: 2007
- Predecessor: Samsung SGH-t309
- Successor: Samsung Stripe
- Related: Samsung SGH-t309, Samsung Stripe, Samsung SGH-t339
- Compatible networks: GSM 850/1800/1900 MHz
- Form factor: flip
- Dimensions: 3.70 x 1.90 x 1.00" (94 x 48 x 25.5 mm)
- Weight: 3.30 oz (94 g)
- Operating system: n/a
- CPU: n/a
- Memory: 60 MB
- Storage: n/a
- Removable storage: none
- Battery: Lithium Ion 1000 mAh
- Rear camera: 0.3 megapixel VGA
- Front camera: n/a
- Display: 128 x 160 px, 65,536 colors, TFT
- External display: Monochrome
- Connectivity: GSM 850/1800/1900 MHz Dual-Band
- Data inputs: Alphanumeric Keypad

The Samsung SGH-T319 is a cell phone for T-Mobile service introduced in Q1 2006, and was designed for both the regular T-Mobile service and the To-Go! Prepaid Services. Designed to mimic the design of the older model, the Samsung SGH-t309, the only difference is that it is light blue.

Features for the phone include T-Zones, wireless internet, speakerphone and a camera. Memory space is about 3 MB, which can hold about 30 640 X 480 VGA photos. Instant messaging services include AOL Instant Messenger, ICQ, and Yahoo messenger. When released, the starting price was about US$139.
