= Samsung SGH-T639 =

Mobile phone model

SGH-T639
- Manufacturer: Samsung Electronics
- Compatible networks: GSM
- Form factor: Clamshell
- Dimensions: 3.7" x 1.5" x 0.66"
- Weight: 3.2 oz (91 g)
- Memory: 30 Megabyte
- Removable storage: microSD
- Rear camera: 1.3 megapixel

The Samsung SGH-T639 is a clamshell mobile phone manufactured by Samsung Electronics and offered by T-Mobile. It has four external changeable faceplates, each with a different color. All four colors (blue, red, olive, and navy) come with each phone. The external screen is longer and slenderer than many similar phones, measuring 1.375 inches (3.49 cm) length by 0.4375 inches (1.111 cm) width. Users can choose the color of the text displayed on the external screen immediately after the phone is closed. The larger internal screen, which is found by opening the phone in portrait mode, measures 1.75 by 1.375 inches (4.45 by 3.49 cm) width.

The SGH-T639 has a 1.3 megapixel camera/camcorder with a small rectangular self-portrait mirror. It has 30 megabytes (MB) of phone storage and a microSD memory card slot. It operates on T-Mobile, a GSM network, and has a SIM card, which can be found by removing the battery case. It has a numerical keypad and an OK button surrounded by four navigational arrow keys (which double by leading to call records, voice notes recording, contact list, and new text message respectively), and two soft keys, along with T-Zones (T-Mobile's web browser), call, end/power, clear, and shortcut keys. The customizable shortcut key with the square icon can lead to or open any feature, application, or menu on the phone. On the left side the phone has two up/down volume rocker keys and the combination charger/headphone jack, and on the right has a key that accesses camera mode as well as the microSD memory card slot.
