= IGT =

IGT may refer to:

== Biology and medicine ==
- Impaired glucose tolerance, in prediabetes

== Technology ==
- International Game Technology, an American gambling equipment manufacturer
  - International Game Technology (1975–2015), a former American gambling equipment manufacturer
- Integrated Telecom Technology(IgT), a former semiconductor company

== Other ==
- Infancy Gospel of Thomas, an apocryphal Christian gospel
- Interlinear Glossed Text, linguistic gloss between lines
- Indicazione Geografica Tipica, Italian wine classification
- Iowa gambling task, decision making simulation
- Magas Airport, Russian Republic of Ingushetia, IATA code
