= Home NodeB =

Type of radio access network element

A Home Node B, or HNB, is the 3GPP's term for a 3G femtocell or Small Cell.

A Node B is an element of a 3G macro Radio Access Network, or RAN. A femtocell performs many of the function of a Node B, but is optimized for deployment in the indoor premises and small coverage public hotspots. The femtocell concept was originally conceived for residential environment. However, it has evolved to include other usages such as enterprise and public hotspots.

Home eNode B is an LTE counterpart of the HNB.

== Architecture ==
Within an HNB Access Network there are three new network elements: the Home Node B (or femtocell), the Security Gateway (SeGW) and the Home Node B Gateway, or HNB-GW.

Between the HNB and the HNB-GW is a new interface known as Iu-h.

Home Node B (HNB) – Connected to an existing residential broadband service, an HNB provides 3G radio coverage for 3G handsets within a home. HNBs incorporate the capabilities of a standard Node B as well as the radio resource management functions of a standard Radio Network Controller RNC.

Security Gateway (SeGW) - Installed in an operator’s network, the Security Gateway establishes IPsec tunnels with HNBs using IKEv2 signaling for IPsec tunnel management. IPsec tunnels are responsible for delivering all voice, messaging and packet data services between HNB and the core network. The SeGW forwards traffic to HNB-GW.

HNB Gateway (HNB-GW) - Installed within an operator’s network, the HNB Gateway aggregates traffic from a large number of HNBs back into an existing core service network through the standard Iu-cs and Iu-ps interfaces.

== Logical Interface ==
Iu-h Interface - Residing between an HNB and HNB-GW, the Iu-h interface defines the security architecture used to provide a secure, scalable communications over the Internet. The Iu-h interface also defines an efficient, reliable method for transporting Iu-based traffic as well as a new protocol (HNBAP) for enabling highly scalable ad hoc HNB deployment.

O&M Interface - Management interface between HNB and Home NodeB Management System (HMS). It uses TR-069 as the management protocol and TR-196 data model. The main purpose is for the configuration of the HNB.

== Standard ==
The following 3GPP documents are currently available:

- 3GPP TR 23.830: Architecture aspects of Home NodeB and Home eNodeB
- 3GPP TR 25.820: 3G Home Node B (HNB) study item Technical Report - A technical report that looks at the air interface and requirements for the protocols to link the Home NodeB to the core network
- 3GPP TS 22.220: Service requirements for Home Node B (HNB) and Home eNode B (HeNB) - End to end architecture
- 3GPP TS 25.467: UTRAN architecture for 3G Home Node B (HNB); Stage 2 - UTRAN architecture for 3G Home NodeB (HNB)
- 3GPP TS 25.469: UTRAN Iuh interface Home Node B (HNB) Application Part (HNBAP) signalling - interface between HNB and HNB-GW
- 3GPP TS 32.581: Operations, Administration, Maintenance and Provisioning (OAM&P); Concepts and requirements for Type 1 interface HNB to HNB Management System (HMS)
- 3GPP TS 32.582: Home Node B (HNB) Operations, Administration, Maintenance and Provisioning (OAM&P); Information model for Type 1 interface HNB to HNB Management System (HMS)
- 3GPP TS 32.583: Home Node B (HNB) Operations, Administration, Maintenance and Provisioning (OAM&P); Procedure flows for Type 1 interface HNB to HNB Management System (HMS)
- 3GPP TS 32.584: Home Node B (HNB) Operations, Administration, Maintenance and Provisioning (OAM&P); XML definitions for Type 1 interface HNB to HNB Management System (HMS)

== See also ==
- Home eNodeB
