= Cascade Communications =

American communications equipment manufacturer

Cascade Communications Corporation
- Company type: Public
- Industry: Computer networking
- Founded: 1990; 36 years ago in Westford, Massachusetts
- Founder: Gururaj Deshpande
- Defunct: 1997; 29 years ago
- Fate: Acquired by Ascend Communications
- Website: casc.com at the Wayback Machine (archived 1997-06-20)

Cascade Communications Corporation was a manufacturer of communications equipment based in Westford, Massachusetts.

== History ==
Cascade was founded by Gururaj Deshpande in 1990, and was led by CEO Dan Smith, VP of Sales Mike Champa and CFO Paul Blondin.

Cascade made a compact Frame Relay and Asynchronous Transfer Mode communication switches that were sold to telecommunication service providers worldwide. Frame Relay service was the primary data service used by companies in the mid-1990s to create secure internal communication networks between separate sites, and Cascade's equipment carried an estimated 70% of the world's Internet traffic during this time.

Their most important direct competitor was StrataCom, which was acquired by Cisco Systems in 1996 for US $4B.

In 1997, Ascend Communications acquired Cascade Communications for US $3.7 Billion, to move into ATM and Frame Relay markets. Ascend was later acquired by Lucent Technologies in 1999 in one of the largest mergers in communications equipment history (US $24 Billion). The Cascade portion of Ascend's business was more interesting to Lucent than the modem termination business that comprised the rest of Ascend.

== Legacy ==
Both Desh Deshpande and CEO Dan Smith profited handsomely from the acquisition, as did hundreds of Cascade employees. In addition, Cascade was notable for invigorating the telecommunications startup culture in Massachusetts in the mid 1990s. Cascade alumni were founders or key contributors to many other financially successful Boston area telecom companies in the late 1990s. Deshpande and Smith went on to found Sycamore Networks and VP of Sales Mike Champa went on to found Omnia Communications and later was the CEO of Winphoria Networks.
