= Samsung SGH-T819 =

Mobile phone model

SGH-T819
- Manufacturer: Samsung Electronics
- Compatible networks: T-Mobile
- Form factor: Slider
- Dimensions: 3.96” x 2.03” x 0.55”
- Weight: 0.2 lb
- Memory: 30
- Removable storage: microSD
- Rear camera: 1.3 megapixel
- Connectivity: 3G

The Samsung SGH-T819 is a slider phone manufactured by Samsung Electronics and offered by T-Mobile. It was released in January 2008.

== Features ==
The T819 is one of T-Mobile's 3G phones offered before the launch of their 3G network. The phone is designed to be a budget feature phone. Its major features are a 3.96 x 2.63 inch display that supports 262,000 colors, a 1.3-megapixel camera, voice dialling, a basic phone book and stereo Bluetooth. The phone is available in a "coffee brown" color.
