= Home eNodeB =

3GPP's term for an LTE femtocell or small cell

A Home eNodeB, or HeNB, is the 3GPP's term for an LTE femtocell or Small Cell.

An eNodeB is an element of an LTE Radio Access Network, or E-UTRAN. A HeNB performs the same function of an eNodeB, but is optimized for deployment for smaller coverage than macro eNodeB, such as indoor premises and public hotspots.

Home Node B is 3G (UMTS) counterpart of the HeNB.

== Architecture ==
Within an HeNB Access Network there are three new network elements: the Home eNodeB, the Security Gateway (SeGW) and the Home eNodeB Gateway, or HeNB-GW.

Home eNodeB (HeNB) – A HeNB provides LTE radio coverage for LTE handsets. HeNBs incorporate the capabilities of a standard eNodeB.

Security Gateway (SeGW) - Installed in an operator's network, the Security Gateway establishes IPsec tunnels with HeNBs using IKEv2 signaling for IPsec tunnel management. IPsec tunnels are responsible for delivering all voice, messaging and packet data services between HeNB and the core network. The SeGW forwards traffic to HeNB-GW.

HeNB Gateway (HeNB-GW) - It is an optional network element (NE) installed within an operator's network. If it is present, it is placed between the HeNB and the MME and it aggregates traffic from a large number of HeNBs back into an existing core service network through the standard S1 interface.

== Architectural Variations ==
There are three architectural variations as described in 3GPP TR23.830. The variations are driven by the following factors: 1) whether the HeNB-GW is present or not, and 2) if HeNB-GW is present, whether the S1 User Plane (S1-U) goes through it or not.

=== Variation 1 ===
HeNB-GW is present and it aggregates both S1-MME and S1-U.

=== Variation 2 ===
HeNB-GW is not present; in this case, the HeNB is directly connected with MME and SGW (i.e. same architecture with normal macro eNodeB).

=== Variation 3 ===
HeNB-GW is present and it aggregates S1-MME only; S1-U interface is directly connected with SGW

== Logical Interface ==
The logical interface on HeNB is the same with the macro eNodeB architecture. There are, however, differences in terms of the termination point of the logical interface depending on whether HeNB-GW is present or not.

Control Plane (CP) Interface - The interface between the HeNB and the HeNB-GW, and between HeNB-GW and MME is S1-MME. From protocol perspective, the same S1AP and X2AP protocols are used in HeNBs as well as macro eNodeBs.

User Plane (UP) Interface - The interface between HeNB and the HeNB-GW, and between HeNB-GW and S-GW is S1-U. If the HeNB-GW is present, then the UP can be carried through either the HeNB-GW or directly to the S-GW; both topologies are possible.

O&M Interface - Management interface between HeNB and Home eNodeB Management System (HeMS). It uses TR-069 (CWMP) as the management protocol and TR-196 data model. The main purpose is for the configuration of the HNB.

== Standard ==
The following 3GPP documents are specifically on HeNB:

- 3GPP TS 22.220: Service requirements for Home Node B (HNB) and Home eNode B (HeNB) - End to end architecture
- 3GPP TR 23.830: Architecture aspects of Home Node B (HNB) / Home enhanced Node B (HeNB) - End to end architecture
- 3GPP TS 28.674: Telecommunication management; Home enhanced Node B (HeNB) Subsystem (HeNS) Network Resource Model (NRM) Integration Reference Point (IRP); Requirements
- 3GPP TS 28.675: Telecommunication management; Home enhanced Node B (HeNB) Subsystem (HeNS) Network Resource Model (NRM) Integration Reference Point (IRP); Information Service (IS)
- 3GPP TS 32.453: Telecommunication management; Performance Management (PM); Performance measurements Home enhanced Node B (HeNB) Subsystem (HeNS)
- 3GPP TS 32.571: Telecommunication management; Home Node B (HNB) and Home eNode B (HeNB) management; Type 2 interface concepts and requirements
- 3GPP TS 32.572: Telecommunication management; Home Node B (HNB) and Home eNode B (HeNB) management; Type 2 interface models and mapping functions
- 3GPP TS 32.591: Telecommunication management; Home enhanced Node B (HeNB) Operations, Administration, Maintenance and Provisioning (OAM&P); Concepts and requirements for Type 1 interface HeNB to HeNB Management System (HeMS)
- 3GPP TS 32.592: Telecommunication management; Home enhanced Node B (HeNB) Operations, Administration, Maintenance and Provisioning (OAM&P); Information model for Type 1 interface HeNB to HeNB Management System (HeMS)
- 3GPP TS 32.593: Telecommunication management; Home enhanced Node B (HeNB) Operations, Administration, Maintenance and Provisioning (OAM&P); Procedure flows for Type 1 interface HeNB to HeNB Management System (HeMS)
- 3GPP TS 32.594: Telecommunication management; Home enhanced Node B (HeNB) Operations, Administration, Maintenance and Provisioning (OAM&P); XML definitions for Type 1 interface HeNB to HeNB Management System (HeMS)
- 3GPP TS 32.781: Telecommunication management; Home enhanced Node B (HeNB) Subsystem (HeNS); Network Resource Model (NRM); Integration Reference Point (IRP); Requirements
- 3GPP TS 32.782: Telecommunication management; Home enhanced Node B (HeNB) Subsystem (HeNS); Network Resource Model (NRM); Integration Reference Point (IRP): Information Service (IS)
- 3GPP TS 32.783: Telecommunication management; Home enhanced Node B (HeNB) Subsystem (HeNS); Network Resource Model (NRM); Integration Reference Point (IRP); Common Object Request Broker Architecture (CORBA) Solution Set (SS)
- 3GPP TS 32.785: Telecommunication management; Home enhanced Node B (HeNB) Subsystem (HeNS); Network Resource Model (NRM); Integration Reference Point (IRP); Bulk CM eXtensible Markup Language (XML) file format definition
- 3GPP TS 32.786: Telecommunication management; Home enhanced Node B (HeNB) Subsystem (HeNS); Network Resource Model (NRM); Integration Reference Point (IRP); Solution Set (SS) definitions
- 3GPP TS 33.320: Security of Home Node B (HNB) / Home evolved Node B (HeNB)
- 3GPP TS 36.300: Evolved Universal Terrestrial Radio Access (E-UTRA) and Evolved Universal Terrestrial Radio Access Network (E-UTRAN); Overall description; Stage 2
- 3GPP TS 36.413: Evolved Universal Terrestrial Radio Access Network (E-UTRAN); S1 Application Protocol (S1AP)
- 3GPP TS 36.423: Evolved Universal Terrestrial Radio Access Network (E-UTRAN); X2 Application Protocol (X2AP)

== See also ==
- Home NodeB
