= Local Management Interface =

Type of signaling standards

Local Management Interface (LMI) is a term for some signaling standards used in networks, namely Frame Relay and Carrier Ethernet.

== Frame Relay ==
LMI is a set of signalling standards between routers and Frame Relay switches. Communication takes place between a router and the first Frame Relay switch to which it is connected. Information about keepalives, global addressing, IP multicast and the status of virtual circuits is commonly exchanged using LMI.

There are three standards for LMI:

- Using DLCI 0:
  - ANSI's T1.617 Annex D standard
  - ITU-T's Q.933 Annex A standard
- Using DLCI 1023:
  - The "Gang of Four" standard, developed by Cisco, DEC, StrataCom and Nortel

== Carrier Ethernet ==
Ethernet Local Management Interface (E-LMI) is an Ethernet layer operation, administration, and management (OAM) protocol defined by the Metro Ethernet Forum (MEF) for Carrier Ethernet networks. It provides information that enables auto configuration of customer edge (CE) devices.
