= Narrowband ISDN =

Failed digital telephony initiative

N-ISDN (Narrowband Integrated Services Digital Network) was an attempt to replace the analog telephone system with a digital one. Unfortunately, the standardization process was too long and regarding to the technology progress in this area, once the standard was finally agreed, it was obsolete.

It generally uses 64 kbit/s channel as the basic unit of switching. It has a circuit switching orientation. Its major contribution was Frame Relay. It describes telecommunication that carries voice information in a narrow band of frequencies.

N-ISDN basic rate is too low so for home as for business today. N-ISDN may be partly saved, but by an unexpected application: Internet access. Various companies now sell ISDN adapters that combine the 2B + D channels into a single 144 kbit/s digital channel. Many Internet providers also support these adapters. So the people can access the Internet over a 144 kbit/s digital link, instead of a 28.8 kbit/s analog modem link and for affordable price that may be a niche for N-ISDN for the next few years.

N-ISDN is also known as Normal-ISDN.

Narrowband refers to data communication and telecommunications tools, technologies and services that utilize a narrower set or band of frequencies in the communication channel. These utilize the channel frequency that is considered flat or which will use a lesser number of frequency sets.

Narrowband is typically implemented in telecommunication technologies to carry voice data on a limited number of frequency sets. The size of the message sent via a narrowband technique utilizes lesser bandwidth than the cumulative bandwidth of the underlying channel.

Narrowband is also used in sending audio spectrums that consume a restricted range of frequencies. The US FCC has allocated a specific range of frequency for mobile radio services based on narrowband that spans from 50cps to 64 kbit/s.
