= Adam Hamway =

American sports announcer (born 1982)

- Born: October 1, 1982 (age 44)
- Sports commentary career
- Teams: New Jersey Devils (2022–present); New York Sirens (2023-present)
- Website: www.adamhamway.com

Adam Hamway (born October 1, 1982) is an American voice actor, impressionist comedian, and public address announcer. He is known for his work as the public address announcer for the National Hockey League's New Jersey Devils and for his commercial voice-over work for several major brands, including MTV, SiriusXM, T-Mobile, Dunkin’ Donuts, and Buffalo Wild Wings.

== Career ==
=== Voice acting, impressionist, and commercial work ===
Hamway gained national recognition in advertising as the voice of Wendy’s during the company's "You Know When It's Real" advertising campaign, which ran from 2009 to 2010. He has also performed comedy and celebrity impressions on Late Night with Jimmy Fallon twice in 2009 and is an Andy Kaufman Award finalist. Also, he had trained in improvisational comedy through the Upright Citizens Brigade and The Second City. He also auditioned for Saturday Night Live at one point as well. Hamway worked in radio production and programming, including his work with SiriusXM. His responsibilities have included producing and programming radio content, booking guests, and developing promotional material.

=== Public address announcer work ===
Since 2022, Hamway serves as the public address announcer for the New Jersey Devils, announcing player introductions, in-game information, and other announcements during the team's home games at the Prudential Center in Newark, New Jersey. He has also worked as a public address announcer at other major venues, including Madison Square Garden, and has served as an announcer for the New York Sirens of the Professional Women's Hockey League.

== Personal life ==
Hamway lives in Nutley, New Jersey with his wife and two children.
