= Samsung Stripe =

Mobile phone model

- Manufacturer: Samsung
- Type: Camera phone
- First released: April 18, 2007
- Form factor: Flip
- Dimensions: 87 mm (3.4 in) x 45 mm (1.8 in) x 24.9 mm (0.98 in)
- Weight: 78 g (2.8 oz)
- Storage: 24MB
- SIM: SIM, MiniSIM
- Battery: 850 mAh, user replaceable
- Display: 128 x 160 pixels (TFT LCD)

The SGH-T329 (also known as the Stripe) is a camera phone manufactured by Samsung for the T-Mobile service. It is also sold as a prepaid bundle for less than $100 at most retailers. Compared to its predecessor the Stripe now includes Bluetooth support.
