= Data link connection identifier =

Network protocol

A data link connection identifier (DLCI) is a Frame Relay 10-bit-wide link-local virtual circuit identifier used to assign frames to a specific PVC or SVC. Frame Relay networks use DLCIs to statistically multiplex frames. DLCIs are preloaded into each switch and act as road signs to the traveling frames.

The standard allows the existence of 1024 DLCIs. DLCI 0 is reserved for the ANSI/q993a LMI standard—only numbers 16 to 976 are usable for end-user equipment. DLCI 1023 is reserved for Cisco LMI, however, numbers 16 to 1007 are usable.

In summary, if using Cisco LMI, numbers from 16 to 1007 are available for end-user equipment. The rest are reserved for various management purposes. DLCI are Layer 2 Addresses that are locally significant. No two devices have the same DLCI mapped to its interface in one frame relay cloud.
