= VoFR =

Voice over Frame Relay (VoFR) is a protocol to transfer voice over Frame Relay networks. VoFR uses two sub-protocols, FRF.11 and FRF.12. FRF.11 defines the frame format of VoFR, and FRF.12 is used for packet fragmentation and reassembly.
