= Rob Ryan (entrepreneur) =

American businessman (born 1948)

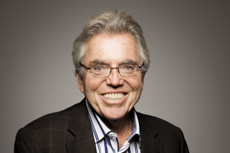
- Born: Robert J. Ryan; 1948 (age 77–78); Bronx, New York, New York
- Education: Cornell University (BA); University of Wisconsin-Madison (MS)
- Known for: Founder and CEO of Ascend Communications
- Spouse: Terry Ryan (m. 1969)

Rob Ryan (born 1948) is an American businessman and entrepreneur. He is best known as a co-founder and former CEO of Ascend Communications, which was ultimately acquired by Lucent Technologies. Ryan has authored two books with his lessons about startup companies.

== Education ==
Raised in the Bronx, New York, Ryan received a scholarship to attend Cornell University, where he earned a Bachelor of Arts degree in 1969. He married his Cornell classmate, Terry Wehe Ryan the same year.

== Career ==
=== Early career ===
Ryan began his career as a systems analyst with Burroughs Corporation. He then worked at Lawrence Livermore National Laboratory a Federally funded research facility. Ryan subsequently worked at Digital Equipment Corporation and Intel where he worked on Ethernet protocols including the "blue book" which would form the basis for IEEE 802.3 His final job before founding his first company was a stint at Ungermann-Bass another pioneer in computer networking.

=== Entrepreneur and Ascend Communications ===
In 1983, Ryan founded Softcom, Inc. to make Ethernet cards. When the company faced cash flow problems, Ryan sold Softcom to Hayes Microcomputer Products in 1984 and worked there as head of their West Coast division until 1988.

Ryan departed Hayes Micro along with Jennette Symons, Jay Duncanson, and Steven Speckenbach. With $3 million in venture capital funding the four of them founded Aria Communication Inc. in 1989, with Ryan as CEO, to make ISDN equipment. The name was changed to Ascend Communications the next year as the company transitioned to focus on equipment for Internet providers. By 1994, profits reached $8.7 million on sales of $39.3 million.

Ascend had its initial public offering in May 1994 raising further funds for growth. Ascend became the leading manufacturer of PoP boxes for Internet providers. In 1995, Ryan's final year, Ascend was called the "top small public stock of the year" by Newsweek.

== Recognition ==
- 1995 Communications Award Winner (Northern California Region), Ernst & Young Entrepreneur of the Year Award
- 2002 Entrepreneur of the Year, Cornell University

== Bibliography ==
- Entrepreneur America: Lessons from Inside Rob Ryan's High-Tech Start-Up Boot Camp (2001 Harper Business ISBN 978-0066620664)
- Smartups: Lessons from Rob Ryan's Entrepreneur America Boot Camp for Start-Ups (2002 Cornell University Press ISBN 978-0801488313)
