= Samsung SGH-T309 =

Mobile phone model

SGH-T309
- Manufacturer: Samsung
- Compatible networks: GSM
- Form factor: Flip
- Dimensions: 3.25" x 1.75" x 0.9"
- Weight: 3.25 oz (92 g)
- Memory: 7 Megabyte
- Battery: Li-ion
- Rear camera: VGA
- Display: 1.77 inch
- External display: 1.0 inch

The Samsung SGH-T309 is a GSM flip phone made by Samsung electronics. It operates on T-Mobile's GSM network. It includes text messaging, voice messaging, and an internal VGA camera.
