= Integrated Telecom Technology =

Or IgT, a former semiconductor company

Integrated Telecom Technology, Inc.
- Type: Private company
- Industry: Semiconductor industry
- Founded: 1991 in Gaithersburg, Maryland
- Founders: Ken Lee; Greg Werth; Imran Chaudhri; Jerry Tall; Chi Wai
- Defunct: May 1998
- Fate: Acquired by PMC-Sierra
- Successor: PMC-Sierra
- Headquarters: Gaithersburg, United States
- Website: igt.com at the Wayback Machine (archived 1998-02-14)

Integrated Telecom Technology (IgT) was an American fabless semiconductor company based in Gaithersburg, Maryland. IgT was one of the first companies to focus on semiconductors for the communications marketplace.

The company was founded in 1991 by Ken Lee, Greg Werth, Imran Chaudhri, Jerry Tall, and Chi Wai in Gaithersburg, Maryland. At its peak, IgT had 60 employees, 45 in its headquarters in Gaithersburg, Maryland and 15 in the San Jose, California office. IgT's logo showed an idealized waveform of a T1 signal. The company was acquired by PMC-Sierra in 1998.

== History ==
The company was founded in 1991 by Ken Lee, Greg Werth, Imran Chaudhri, Jerry Tall, and Chi Wai. The name used was the acronym IgT because IGT was already in use by International Game Technology (IGT). The acronym ITT also could not be used given the historic firm ITT in the telecom industry. IgT did own the domain name igt.com, which was subsequently sold to IGT.

=== Early products ===
IgT's first product was a B8ZS framer device for the T1 market. IgT also introduced an OC-3 ATM framer device that was competitive in the marketplace. This device was designed by Imran Chaudhri who was a central figure in many of IgT's developments.

=== Samsung relationship - 1994 ===
In January 1994, IgT engaged with the Telecom division of Samsung in Korea to build an ATM Switch chip set for use in the StarRacer system. This chip set was developed under contract with Network Synthesis, Inc. known as "NSI", a small chip design firm. This led to the investment and eventual majority ownership of IgT by Samsung.

=== Network Synthesis acquisition - 1996 ===
In June 1996 IgT acquired NSI, whose CEO and principal design engineer, Brian Holden, became CTO of IgT. NSI was also developing an AAL-1 SAR known as the AAL1gator under contract with IgT. After the acquisition, the AAL1gator became a very successful product and drove IgT's eventual acquisition by PMC-Sierra, Inc. The AAL1gator was also a contributing factor in the acquisitions of OnStream Networks by 3Com in 1996 and Sentient Networks by Cisco Systems in 1998; both of these companies had developed systems that strongly leveraged the AAL1gator's capabilities.

=== Joint development with Ericsson ===
The San Jose office also developed an ATM switch chip set in a joint development with Ericsson Telecom of Sweden. Chee Hu was a central figure in this development. This was a multi-year development that led to the successful AXD-301 ATM switch deployment by Ericsson. This system was used heavily in British Telecom's network. This chipset led to 9 ATM related patents being awarded to IgT and PMC-Sierra.

=== Acquisition by PMC-Sierra - 1998 ===
The AAL1Gator device was designed to connect to T1/E1 framers sold by PMC-Sierra. The runaway success of the AAL1gator device drove the sales of many additional T1/E1 framers by PMC. This led to the acquisition of IgT by PMC-Sierra, Inc. in May 1998 for USD $55M. This was also driven by the 1997 Asian financial crisis, which caused Samsung to become interested in selling its interest in the company. The AAL1gator also sold well for PMC-Sierra.

=== Subsequent to acquisition ===
In 2003 PMC-Sierra shut down the IgT office in Gaithersburg, Maryland laying off all of the remaining employees there. A number of the San Jose office employees remain with the company.

Several of the devices produced by IgT remain for sale by PMC. A number of other devices were discontinued when LSI Logic dropped support for the fabrication process in which they were made.

== Legacy ==
Despite the shutdown of the IgT design center in Gaithersburg in the aftermath of the telecom bubble, IgT was a fair investment for PMC-Sierra. The substantial rate of return from IgT is due to the combination of the moderate price paid by PMC, the strong financial return provided by the AAL1gator family of products, and the contribution of the remaining San Jose team to several successful PMC projects, including the strong selling Arrow2xGE Ethernet over SONET mapping device. When evaluated on a rate of ROI basis (rate of Return on Investment), IgT likely ranks second amongst the 14 Sierra/PMC-Sierra acquisitions, behind the acquisition of PMC by Sierra Semiconductor.
