= Fred Sammartino =

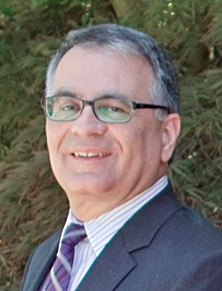
Fred Sammartino in 2012

Fred Sammartino is an American communications-industry engineer and executive, well known as the founding president and chairman of the board of the ATM Forum.

In the 1980s, Sammartino worked for David Systems Inc. of Sunnyvale, California, where he was product-line manager for a product technology to deliver Ethernet over two twisted pairs, before the 10BASE-T Ethernet standard emerged.

Sammartino also worked at Apple Computer before joining Sun Microsystems and founding the ATM Forum. Educated at Rensselaer Polytechnic Institute and Stanford University, as of 2013 he is director of product management at Azuki Systems in the Boston area.
