= Ascend Communications =

Alameda, California-based manufacturer of communications equipment

Ascend Communications, Inc.
- Type: Public
- Traded as: ASND (Nasdaq)
- Industry: Communications equipment
- Founders: Jay Duncanson, Rob Ryan, Steve Speckenbach, Jeanette Symons
- Fate: Acquired by Lucent Technologies in 1999
- Headquarters: Alameda, California, United States
- Key people: Rob Ryan (CEO 1988-1995), Mory Ejabat (CEO 1995-1999)
- Number of employees: 1,800 (1997)
- Website: ascend.com at the Wayback Machine (archived 1999-02-08)

Ascend Communications, Inc. was an Alameda, California-based manufacturer of communications equipment that was later purchased by Lucent Technologies in 1999.

Ascend Communications was founded in 1988 and taken public in 1994. Initial investors included Kleiner, Perkins, Caulfield and Byers (KPCB); Greylock Partners; and New Enterprise Associates (NEA).

Ascend Communications designed and manufactured equipment for high-density dialup installations, most notably the MAX TNT, which allowed for a DS3 of dialup lines to be terminated in a few rack units. Customers such as AOL, Earthlink, Demon Internet, and UUnet purchased over two million dialup ports worth of MAX TNT access servers during the dialup days of the internet. Many companies still use MAX TNT for dialup (look for TNT in dialup hostnames). In the mid-1990s, the company was one of the leading vendors of ISDN modems and concentrators.

Ascend Communications also acquired several companies. In 1996, it acquired NetStar, an Eden Prairie, Minnesota-based publicly traded manufacturer of ultra-high-performance, switched backplane, backbone routers capable 16 Gbit/s throughput.

In 1997, Ascend acquired Cascade Communications. Cascade designed and manufactured high-density carrier packet switches, including the B-STDX9000 frame relay switch and the CBX-500 and GX-550 ATM switches. The B-STDX and CBX/GX lines were the workhorses of most RBOC Frame Relay and ATM networks throughout the 1990s and into the 21st century.

In February 1997, Ascend released the DSLPipe series.

In August 1998, Ascend bought Stratus Computers for $822 million in stock. Stratus was primarily a maker of fault-tolerant computer systems but it owned a Service Control Point technology critical to the convergence of voice and data networks that Ascend valued. The server business was sold off to private equity investors within months, following the Lucent deal. It now operates as Stratus Technologies.

The company was acquired by Lucent Technologies in 1999. The $24 billion merger was the largest technology merger in history up to that time. Former executives of Ascend founded the company Zhone Technologies.

Ascend's stock traded under the Nasdaq symbol ASND.

== See also ==
- Livingston Enterprises
