= Circuit emulation service =

Telecommunication technology

Circuit emulation service (CES) is a telecommunication technology used to send information over asynchronous data networks like ATM, Ethernet or MPLS, so that it is received error-free with constant delay, similar to a leased line.

CES was introduced for ATM networks. As the interest for ATM is declining, most new applications work over packet-based (IP)-networks. Two commonly used protocols are SAToP (IETF RFC 4553) and CESoPSN (IETF RFC 5086).

== Reasons for circuit emulation ==
Examples of channels needing constant delay include time-division multiplexed (TDM) services such as the traditional digital signal (DS) and the E-carrier circuits.

The core networks are in the evolution to packet-switched networks such as Metro Ethernet, IP/Ethernet and MPLS. These packet switching-based networks provide more cost-effective communications with comparison with traditional TDM based networks (PDH, SDH), especially for Internet services.

But the legacy TDM and ATM equipment has been widely deployed in traditional telecommunication networks: private branch exchanges (PBX) in enterprise offices, PDH/SDH equipment in carrier offices and near wireless stations. Service providers seek to continue using this equipment rather than replacing it. Especially the widely deployed 2G and 2.5G base stations are using TDM based interfaces to communicate with BSC (Base Station Controller). The early deployed 3G Node B is using ATM based protocols running on PDH/SDH physical interfaces. These base stations will exist for quite a long time in evolution to LTE.

Circuit emulation service technology allows companies to easily migrate to packet-switched networks. With CES, the legacy TDM and ATM services are supported with much more cost-effective infrastructures based on low-cost and highly available Ethernet devices. This is a reverse mapping approach with regard to traditional solutions in which IP/ethernet services is carried in ATM or PDH/SDH protocols.

CES technology makes it possible to leverage the modern network technologies like MPLS or IP backbones, Metro Ethernet, WiFi, IP-DSLAM and GPON/EPON access networks.

== See also ==
- ATM Forum § Circuit Emulation Service
