= Network Norway =

Norwegian mobile network operator

- Company type: Private
- Industry: Telecommunications
- Founded: 2006
- Founders: Former employees of Telenor and NetCom
- Fate: Sold to Ice.net in 2014
- Headquarters: Oslo, Norway
- Area served: Norway
- Products: Mobile telephony
- Parent: Tele2 (2011–2014)

Network Norway was a Norwegian mobile network operator founded in 2006 by a group of former employees from Telenor and NetCom. Together with Siemens, the company established a new GSM-900 network within a few months and launched commercial services in 2007, initially covering the Oslo metropolitan area, Stavanger and Trondheim. Outside these areas, customers were able to roam on the NetCom Norway network.

== History ==
The company was founded in 2006 by small group of people from Telenor and NetCom. Together with Siemens - during a few months in 2006/2007 - they built a new mobile operator from scratch and had a commercial launch of the GSM-900 network in 2007. This is probably one of the quickest launches of a mobile operator in history. Their network covered the greater Oslo area, as well as the cities of Stavanger and Trondheim. Outside these cities, customers could roam on the network of the Norwegian operator Netcom Norway.

During 2007 Network Norway attracted several other partners like One Call and Lebara Group (now MyCall) into using their network and late in 2007 Network Norway and Tele2 formed the company Mobile Norway, both having equal shares of 50%. Mobile Norway is the seventh Norwegian company to win a license to operate a commercial mobile network

Early in 2008, the company won a UMTS license, but as of July, 2009, the network is not on the air. In December 2009 (21st) Mobile Norway signed a contract with equipment vendor Ericsson as provider of their 2G and 3G network.

As of March 2010 Network Norway is the only Norwegian mobile network operator who sells the new Nexus One in Norway.

In 2011 Tele2 was the owner of Network Norway. In 2014 Tele2 was bought by TeliaSonera (NetCom (Norway)) while Network Norway was sold from Tele2 to Ice.net
