= Broadband Forum =

American industry consortium

- Membership logo from 2008
- Predecessor: DSL Forum
- Formation: November 1994 (as ADSL Forum)
- Type: Non profit industry organization
- Headquarters: Fremont, California
- Website: broadband-forum.org

The Broadband Forum is a non-profit industry consortium that develops technical specifications for broadband networking. Members include telecommunications networking and service provider companies, broadband device and equipment vendors, consultants and independent testing labs (ITLs). Service provider members are primarily wire-line service providers (non-mobile) telephone companies.

== History ==

the Frame Relay Forum and the MPLS Forum were eventually merged into the Broadband Forum

The DSL Forum was founded in 1994 with about 200 member companies in different divisions of the telecommunication and information technology sector. It is used as a platform for companies that operate in the broadband market. Its initial main purpose was the establishment of new standards around digital subscriber line communication products such as provisioning. This cooperation has brought different standardizations for ADSL, SHDSL, VDSL, ADSL2+ and VDSL2.

The group was established in November 1994 as the ADSL Forum and was renamed to DSL Forum in 1999. It was renamed after the digital subscriber line (DSL) family of technology, also known collectively as xDSL.

Among its early design documents, the Forum created TR-001 (1996) system reference model, which together with later TR-012 (1999) core network architecture, recommended PPP over an ATM transport layer as the best practice for a DSL ISP. This was subsequently refined in TR-025 and TR-059.

Starting in 2004, the Forum expanded its work into other last mile technologies including optical fiber. On 17 June 2008 it changed its name to "Broadband Forum". DSL-related specifications, while still a key part of the forum's work, are no longer its only work. For instance, the forum produced work specific to passive optical networking (PON). Its Auto-Configuration Server specification TR-069, originally published in 2004, was adapted for use with set-top box and Network Attached Storage units.

The Forum's TR-101 specification (2006) documents migration toward an Ethernet-based DSL aggregation model (Ethernet DSLAMs).

In May 2009, IP/MPLS Forum merged with the Broadband Forum. It had promoted the Frame Relay and Multiprotocol Label Switching technologies. Technical work of IP/MPLS Forum continued in a newly created "IP/MPLS and Core" Working Group of the Broadband Forum. The historical specifications from the IP/MPLS Forum's predecessors, ATM Forum, Frame Relay Forum, MFA Forum, and MPLS Forum, are archived on the Broadband Forum's website, under IP/MPLS Forum specifications.

Broadband Forum issued Femto Access Point Service Data Model TR-196 during April 2009 and version 2 released during November 2011.

Broadband Forum specified in TR-348 for Hybrid Access Networks an architecture that enables network operators to efficiently combine XDSL and LTE.

== Standards ==
=== TR-369 - User Services Platform (USP) ===
USP formally specified in Broadband Forum Technical Report TR-369, is a protocol for secure, standards-based remote management of connected devices and services. First published in March 2018 by Axiros, USP represents an evolution of the earlier CPE WAN Management Protocol (CWMP, TR-069), designed to address the requirements of modern smart home, IoT, and converged broadband environments.

USP defines a framework for communication between Controllers (management systems, service provider platforms, or user applications) and Agents (software components embedded in customer premises equipment, routers, or IoT devices). Key capabilities include:

- Device lifecycle management: Configuration, monitoring, diagnostics, firmware updates, and remote troubleshooting
- Multi-controller architecture: Unlike TR-069's single Auto Configuration Server model, USP supports multiple management entities Broadband Forum (service providers, end users, third-party applications) interacting securely with the same device
- Flexible message transport: USP messages can be carried over WebSockets, STOMP, MQTT, and CoAP TelecomTV to suit different deployment scenarios
- Binary encoding: Uses Protocol Buffers (Protobuf) for efficient message encoding, replacing TR-069's XML-based approach
- Security: End-to-end TLS encryption, certificate-based authentication, and role-based access control
- Data modeling: Based on the Device:2 data model (TR-181), ensuring vendor interoperability

USP is designed to co-exist with and enable migration from existing TR-069 deployments Broadband Forum, supporting use cases including managed Wi-Fi, IoT device integration, mass telemetry collection, and containerized application management.

== See also ==
- ATM Forum
