= T-Mobile 4G LTE CellSpot =

Cellular base station

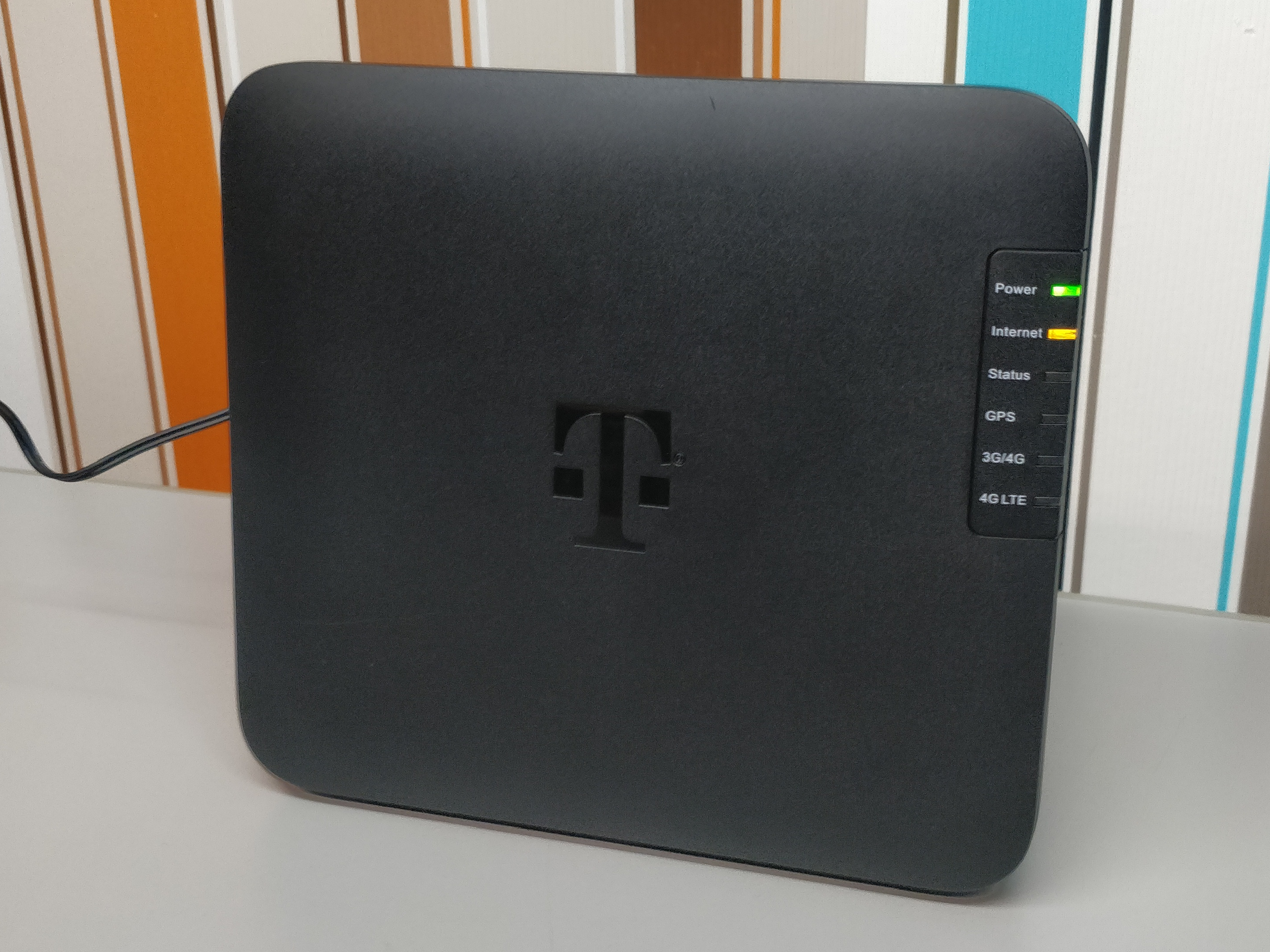
- T-Mobile 4G LTE CellSpot V2
- Manufacturer: Askey Computer Corp. (subsidiary of Asus), Nokia and T-Mobile USA
- Type: Femtocell
- Availability: 2015
- Introductory price: Free in combination with subscription
- System on a chip: Qualcomm FSM99xx series with Qualcomm Hexagon-based modem
- Connectivity: LTE and UMTS
- Power: 12V, 2A
- Website: t-mobile.com at the Wayback Machine (archived 2020-02-15)

The T-Mobile 4G LTE CellSpot is a femtocell released by T-Mobile US in 2015.

== Developments ==
In 2016, Qualcomm announced a collaboration with T-Mobile and Nokia for the development of femtocells.

== Versions ==
The original version and version 2 have been released.
