= ATM Forum =

Industry consortium to promote Asynchronous Transfer Mode technology

- Company type: Consortium
- Founded: 1991; 34 years ago
- Defunct: 2005; 20 years ago
- Fate: Merged with MPLS and Frame Relay Alliance
- Successor: MFA Forum
- Website: atmforum.com at the Wayback Machine (archived 2005-07-01)

The ATM Forum was a non-profit industry consortium founded in 1991 to promote Asynchronous Transfer Mode technology. The founding president and chairman was Fred Sammartino of Sun Microsystems. The ATM Forum created over 200 implementation agreements.

== History ==
In 1996 ATM technology stabilized with the "Anchorage Accord", which established the baseline of ATM implementations. While ATM did not live up to every expectation, it remained an important core network technology. The Frame Relay Forum (promoting Frame Relay) also started in 1991. The MPLS Forum (which supported Multiprotocol Label Switching had begun in 2000. Those two merged in 2003 to become the MPLS and Frame Relay Alliance (MFA). In 2005, the ATM Forum joined forces with the MFA to form the MFA Forum, which was renamed to be the IP/MPLS Forum. In May 2009 the IP/MPLS Forum merged with the Broadband Forum.

== Sampling of specifications ==
- ATM-MPLS Network Interworking
- Multi-Protocol Over ATM
- TM 4.1
- User-Network Interface
- B-ICI
- ANNI
- PNNI
- Frame-based ATM
- ILMI
- 622.08 Mbit/s physical layer
- Inverse ATM Mux
- Circuit Emulation Service
- ATM Security Framework

== Circuit Emulation Service ==
A widely adopted specification to emerge from the ATM Forum was the Circuit Emulation Service (CES) specification. This specification defined a method of creating a service out of mapping TDM DS0 and DS1/E1 Plesiochronous Digital Hierarchy (PDH) signals into Asynchronous Transfer Mode (ATM) cells. It also supported J2 and DS-3 signals. The service was built around the ATM Adaption Layer 1 specification from the ITU. The 1.0 version was approved about 1995 and the 2.0 version was approved in January 1997.
