= StrataCom =

Company

- Company type: Division
- Industry: Computer networking
- Founded: United States (1986)
- Fate: Acquired by Cisco Systems
- Headquarters: Cupertino, California, United States
- Parent: Cisco Systems

StrataCom, Inc. was a supplier of Asynchronous Transfer Mode (ATM) and Frame Relay high-speed wide area network (WAN) switching equipment. StrataCom was founded in Cupertino, California, United States, in January 1986, by 26 former employees of the failing Packet Technologies, Inc. StrataCom produced the first commercial cell switch, also known as a fast-packet switch. ATM was one of the technologies underlying the world's communications systems in the 1990s.

== Origins of the IPX at Packet Technologies ==
Internet pioneer Paul Baran was a founder of PacketCable and provided the spark of invention of packet voice at the initiation of the Integrated Packet Exchange (IPX) project. Packet voice was first thought of as an add-on to PacketCable's advanced cable system but soon became a telephony product. PacketCable was renamed Packet Technologies as a result of the addition of the IPX project to the company. (StrataCom's IPX communication system is unrelated to Novell's IPX Internetwork Packet Exchange protocol.)

The IPX was initially known as the PacketDAX, which was a play on words of Digital access and cross-connect system (or DACS). A rich collection of inventions were contained in the IPX, and many were provided by the other members of the development team. The names on the original three IPX patents are Paul Baran, Charles Corbalis, Brian Holden, Jim Marggraff, Jon Masatsugu, David Owen and Pete Stonebridge. StrataCom's implementation of ATM was pre-standard and used 24 byte cells instead of the 53 byte cells of the later standards-based ATM. However, many of concepts and details found in the ATM set of standards were derived directly from StrataCom's technology, including the use of CRC-based framing on its links.

== The IPX development ==
The IPX's first use was as a 4-1 voice compression system. It implemented Voice-Activity-Detection (VAD) and ADPCM, which together, gave 4-1 compression allowing 96 telephone calls to be fit into the space of 24. The IPX was also used as an enterprise voice-data networking system as well as a global enterprise networking system. McGraw-Hill's Data communications Magazine included the IPX in its list of "20 Most Significant Communications Products of the Last 20 Years" in a 1992 edition.

The Beta test of the IPX was in Michigan Bell between Livonia, Plymouth, and Northville, 3 suburbs of Detroit. The first customer shipment was to the May Company between department stores in San Diego and Los Angeles. The most significant early use of the IPX was as the backbone of the Covia/United Airlines flight reservation system. It also was used in multiple corporate networks including those of CompuServe, Intel and Hewlett-Packard. Covia and DEC resold the IPX. DEC invested in StrataCom in 1990.

== IPX Frame Relay Development ==
The IPX's most successful use was as the first Frame Relay networking product. It formed the core of the first Frame Relay product developed by WilTel and introduced in March 1991. It was later used by AT&T and CompuServe Frame Relay networks. StrataCom was also involved in the standardization of Frame Relay as a technology in 1990. The FRP card that implemented Frame Relay was introduced in 1991 and perfected in 1992.

== The IPX product ==
The cards in the original 1986 IPX system were:

- The PCC — The Processor Control Card — a Motorola 68000 based shelf control card
- The VDP — The Voice Data Processor — Implemented a VAD algorithm and packetized the voice
- The VCD — The Voice Compressor-Decompressor — Implemented ADPCM
- The TXR — The Transmit Receive Card — Implemented a T1 interface with packet queues
- The PIC — The Protection Interface Card — Allowed the T1 interfaces to be swapped

The cards in the 1989 second wave were:

- The SDP — The Synchronous Data Processor — added V.35, RS-422, and RS-232 data to the IPX. The name FDP referred to the combination of the SDP with a back card. The SDP was a very early use of Xilinx FPGAs, and StrataCom was its largest customer for a time.
- The CDP — The Circuit Data Processor — Added E1 and integrated echo cancellation

The card in the 1991 third wave was:

- The FRP — The Frame Relay Processor — Added Frame Relay to the IPX (implemented the SAR function in Motorola 56000 DSP's)

== Public listing ==
StrataCom went public in the fall of 1992 under the ticker symbol STRM. Three of its executives later formed SToRM Ventures. They were Tae HeaNahm, Ryan Floyd and Sanjay Subhedar

== The BPX Development ==
The BPX, which was produced in 1993, increased the speed and sophistication of the Frame Relay offering. It also supported the 53 byte cells of the ATM standard instead the IPX's 24 byte cells. This product was used by AT&T in its frame relay network.

== The IGX Development ==
The original IPX product was sped-up with a bus adapter and re-introduced as the IGX.

== Acquisition by Cisco Systems ==
Cisco Systems acquired StrataCom in 1996 for US$4 billion. The acquired employees formed the core of Cisco's Multi-Service Switching Business Unit and helped to move Cisco more into the high-availability carrier equipment space from the enterprise equipment business that it had largely been in before the acquisition.

== StrataCom management ==
StrataCom's first CEO was Steve Campbell who later went to Packeteer. Dick Moley, who came from ROLM Corporation, served as its CEO for most of its existence. Dave Sant originally led sales, hiring Scott Kriens who later became CEO of Juniper Networks. Bill Stensrud was the founding Vice President of Marketing (and later became a managing partner of venture capital firm Enterprise Partners).

== Locations ==
The company was first located in Cupertino at 10341 Bubb Road. It then moved to Campbell at 3175 Winchester Boulevard and later to San Jose at 1400 Parkmoor Avenue. The company also had a manufacturing building in south San Jose built for it in 1996; this building was selected in 2006 by Nanosolar as the site of a large solar cell factory.
