= HNBAP =

Type of network control protocol

HNBAP is a control protocol found in Home Node B networks. It provides:

- Registration of HNB with the HNB-GW
- Identification of the HNB
- Registration of UE with the HNB-GW (through HNB)

== Standard ==
The following 3GPP documents are available:

- 3GPP TR 25.469: HNBAP Technical Report - A technical report that looks at the UTRAN Iuh interface Home Node B (HNB) Application Part (HNBAP) signalling
- 3GPP TR 25.820: 3G Home NodeB Study Item Technical Report - A technical report that looks at the air interface and requirements for the protocols to link the Home NodeB to the core network
- 3GPP TS 22.220: Service requirements for Home NodeBs (UMTS) and eNodeBs (LTE) - End to end architecture
- 3GPP TS 25.467: UTRAN architecture for 3G Home Node B (HNB); Stage 2 UTRAN architecture for 3G Home NodeB (HNB)

== Architecture ==
Between the HNB and the HNB-GW is a new interface known as Iu-h.

Iu-h Interface - Residing between an HNB and HNB-GW, the Iu-h interface defines the security architecture used to provide a secure, scalable communications over the Internet. The Iu-h interface also defines an efficient, reliable method for transporting Iu-based traffic as well as a new protocol HNBAP for enabling highly scalable ad hoc HNB deployment.

Within an HNB Access Network there are three new network elements: the Home Node B (or femtocell), the Security Gateway (SeGW) and the Home Node B Gateway, or HNB-GW.

Home Node B (HNB) – Connected to an existing residential broadband service, an HNB provides 3G radio coverage for 3G handsets within a home. HNBs incorporate the capabilities of a standard Node B as well as the radio resource management functions of a standard Radio Network Controller RNC.

Security Gateway (SeGW) - Installed in an operator's network, the Security Gateway establishes IPsec tunnels with HNBs using IKEv2 signaling for IPsec tunnel management. IPsec tunnels are responsible for delivering all voice, messaging and packet data services between HNB and the core network. The SeGW forwards traffic to HNB-GW.

HNB Gateway (HNB-GW) - Installed within an operator's network, the HNB Gateway aggregates traffic from a large number of HNBs back into an existing core service network through the standard Iu-cs and Iu-ps interfaces.
