= T-Mobile =

T-Mobile is the brand of telecommunications by Deutsche Telekom.

T-Mobile may also refer to:

== Deutsche Telekom subsidiaries ==
Logo used by Deutsche Telekom subsidiaries

- T-Mobile US, an American wireless network operator known simply as "T-Mobile"
- T-Mobile Polska, a Polish mobile phone network operator
- T-Mobile Czech Republic, a Czech wireless network operator
- T-Mobile UK, a former UK mobile phone network operator which merged with the former Orange UK to create EE
- Magenta Telekom, an Austria wireless network operator formerly known as T-Mobile Austria
- Odido, a Dutch mobile phone network operator formerly known as T-Mobile Netherlands

== Products ==
- T-Mobile MDA, a series of T-Mobile-branded phones
- T-Mobile 4G LTE CellSpot, a femtocell

== Sporting venues ==
- T-Mobile Arena, a multi-purpose arena in Las Vegas
- T-Mobile Center, a multi-purpose arena in Kansas City, Missouri
- T-Mobile Park, a baseball stadium in Seattle, Washington
