= Signal booster =

A signal booster is a system which increases, or appears to increase, the power of a radio signal. The term may refer to:

- Radio repeater
- Relay transmitter
- Cellular repeater
