= Wireless tower =

Wireless tower can refer to

- Telegraph station
- Cell site or cell tower
- Radio tower
- Communication tower
