= Panel antenna =

Type of antenna

A panel antenna, in its simplest form, consists of a dipole placed ahead of a flat-panel reflector.

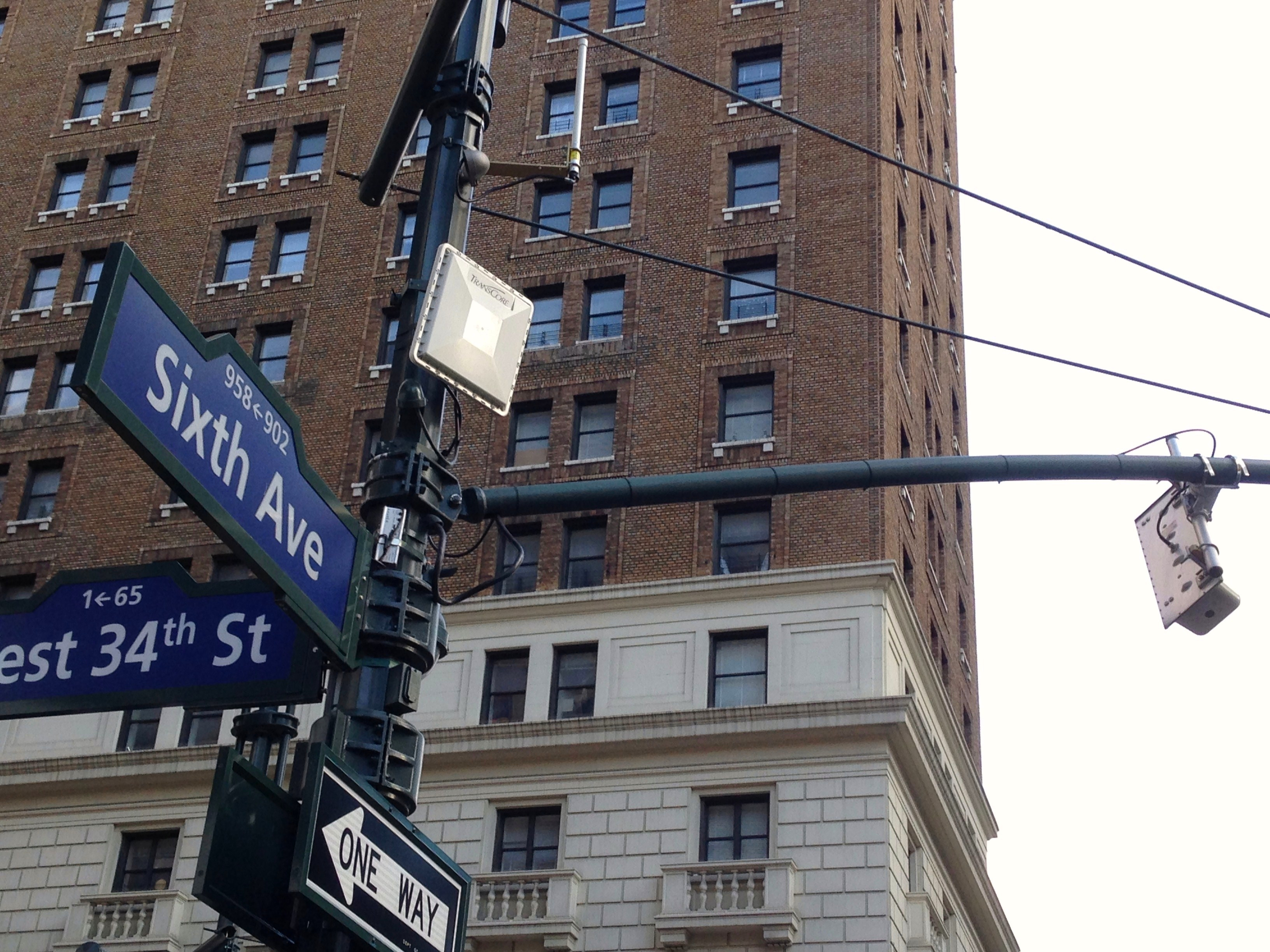
A simple panel antenna mounted on a light pole

== Frequencies ==
Panel antennas are common at ultra high frequencies or UHF, where they are often used for cellular/mobile base stations or wireless networking due to their size and directional properties. At very high frequencies, such an antenna would be impractically large for most receiving applications unless implemented as no more than a two-bay design. Some full-power radio stations do use multiple panel antenna bays, installed one above the other on the side of a tall antenna tower, to provide a directional transmitter pattern on these frequencies.

The panel antenna is not practical at HF or lower frequencies due to its mechanical size.

== Engineering and design ==
Most often, a panel antenna will be constructed as multiple "bays" - each consisting of an individual dipole placed before a shared reflector - with all of these bays connected in parallel to increase received signal strength. These forms of antennae were introduced in the late 1980s as a "C.F.R." by C.F.R. America (Circa 1989).

== See also ==
- Sector antenna
- Reflective array antenna
