= Mass call event =

Situation where a high number of calls cause degraded phone services

A mass call event or mass calling event (also MCE in telephony usage) is a situation in which an extraordinarily high number of telephone calls are attempted into or out of an area, causing tremendous network congestion, and resulting in service that is significantly degraded or potentially unavailable.

The term is typically used with mobile telephony systems, in which there are simply not enough radio channels available in a given cell or cells. This causes blocked calls or dropped calls. However, it can also apply to landline phones, in which not enough trunking telephone circuits are available into and out of any given telephone exchange or equivalent switching office at any level of the public switched telephone network (PSTN).

An MCE is typically caused by natural disasters such as earthquakes, tropical cyclones, or tornadoes. The assassination of John F. Kennedy and the September 11 attacks represented mass call events.

Access-class barring is one solution in such a situation, allowing public safety (PS) personnel such as emergency responders to have priority on the network, as well as general emergency calls to public-safety answering points (PSAPs). This typically only affects voice calls, therefore text messaging is a very effective way of communication during an MCE, as it only needs a brief connection to the network to be sent or received, and uses almost nothing in terms of network resources like bandwidth.

Mass call events can also be caused by planned events. In 1982, Eddie Murphy's Larry the Lobster shtick on Saturday Night Live resulted in record call volume, as Murphy held a live lobster and declared that the show's audience would determine whether he lived or died via telephone calls. The gathering in Washington, D.C. for the 2009 U.S. Presidential Inauguration of Barack Obama also created a MCE. In this case, network overload was avoided by deploying multiple cell-on-wheels (CoW) units with their own wireless backhauls. This was a particularly major situation for cell carriers because many attendees wanted to be live on the phone (via voice call or video chat) with others who could not attend the ceremony, further increasing network usage.
