= Telecommunications lease =

Legal allowance to construct cellular towers over property

A telecommunications lease is a real-estate agreement under which a landowner grants a telecommunications provider or infrastructure company the right to install and operate antennas, towers, equipment shelters, cables, or related equipment on a defined part of a property. In return, the tenant pays rent for the agreed term. The agreement may also address access to the site, power, maintenance, renewal, assignment, and removal of equipment.

== Industry growth ==
Communications providers may own their sites or lease space on infrastructure owned by other businesses. The Federal Communications Commission has noted that many communications towers in the United States are owned by companies that do not themselves provide communications services, but instead lease space to service providers. Towers more than 200 feet (61 m) high, or within an airport glide slope, must be registered in the FCC's Antenna Structure Registration system.

== Types of leases ==
In the telecommunications industry, there are two types of telecommunications leases: a rooftop lease agreement and a ground lease agreement. In some cases, cellular sites are installed on the roofs of commercial office buildings or residential living complexes. These rooftop installations take advantage of the height of the buildings on which they are installed to provide quality cellular coverage. Ground leases, on the other hand are contracts typically made between the cellular provider and the landowner of a property for space at the ground level on which a cellular tower is installed.

=== Rooftop leases ===
Rooftops are leased for many different communication purposes, including many different types of antennas. Panel antennas are commonly placed on rooftops in urban and densely populated residential areas. These antennas typically range from 1–10 feet in height and have the ability to service multiple technologies, including: cellular antennas, PCS antennas, specialized mobile radios, fixed wireless services, and paging services.

Satellite dishes are also mounted on some rooftops, primarily for satellite TV service, but in other cases, much larger dishes are used. These antennas generally address Internet and cable needs and therefore are used for services such as video conferencing.

Rooftop leases include details about the amount of space leased, installation methods, and upgrade procedures that allow the tenant to operate at the site as needed while protecting the landlord's building.

=== Ground leases ===
Ground leases generally address antenna towers or billboards in which the landowner leases the space, or land, to the cellular provider to build the tower. Antenna towers range between 50 and 300 feet tall. These large, free-standing cellular towers can sometimes be “disguised” to blend in with the natural architecture of the building or the surrounding landscape. An example of this is a church property that may have a tower built to resemble, or in some cases built into an existing steeple. Alternatively, a property owner for another type of property may have a monopine or monopalm cellular structure. These are built to resemble pine or palm trees respectively.

== Components ==
=== Zoning ===
Proposals for new cell towers sometimes face public opposition in zoning proceedings from residents who raise aesthetic objections and fear health hazards.

Local zoning boards must follow the rules set forth in the Telecommunications Act of 1996. which sets guidelines for what are acceptable reasons to not permit the construction of a new cellular tower. A cellular tower zoning ordinance set in place in Greenburgh, New York in 1996 emphasizing esthetics, has been used as a model for communities to create their own wireless telecommunications ordinances.

=== Redundancy ===
Generally, cellular providers look for property that is in a densely populated area and that falls outside of a five-mile radius from the nearest tower. For a cellular company, redundancy occurs when two or more towers serve the same area. This often causes a loss of income for the cellular provider, as they generally need one tower rather than multiple. As companies continue to merge, redundancy has become a rising issue within the telecommunication industry.

=== Duration and termination ===
Generally, telecom leases are for an initial five-year term followed by additional five-year renewal terms. Leases typically also have a 30- to 90-day cancellation period when the cellular provider has the right to terminate the lease within 30 to 90 days of giving notice to the landowner. This specific portion of a telecom lease is due to recent mergers in the industry, which render some towers useless. Due to cellular providers merging with other cellular companies, one company can double its number of towers. This often causes redundancy, as previously mentioned, which often leads to the termination of leases and the removal of redundant towers.

=== Fair market value ===
The fair market value of a lease is generally determined by the importance of the location to the cellular carrier's network, or the value of the coverage the location provides. The value will also be driven by the availability of surrounding alternate sites. Determining the fair market value of a cellular lease is difficult for most landowners due to a lack of available information. Cell tower lease rates are not public information, and these rates vary widely. There are however companies that specialize in providing information and assistance to property owners in this highly specialized field.

In order to make money, cellular carriers often undervalue a lease. Leasing agents typically receive bonuses for signing low-priced leases and therefore undervalue leases because the worse the deal is for the landowner, the greater the benefits are for the leasing agent. There are several methods for a landowner to evaluate their property:

1. Are there cell towers owned by the cellular company near by?
2. Is your property located in a densely populated area?
3. Is there a high demand for cellular coverage near your property?

=== Colocation ===
Colocation is when the cellular company allows other companies to build on their tower. As a result, the cellular company that owns the tower receives rent from the co-locators. Within a lease, landowners can address colocation and receive a portion of the rent received by the cellular company.

=== Cell tower lease buyout ===
Property owners have the ability to sell their cell tower lease separately from their parcel. A Cell Tower Lease Prepayment or "buyout" is when a Landlord decides to sell their lease for a lump-sum of Cash today. The lump-sum is a discounted cash flow for a period of the term defined in the Purchase and Sale Agreement. Investors purchase the cell tower lease as an easement or lease assignment.

Converting a wireless lease agreement to a Telecommunications Easement is the safest way to perform a Prepayment or Buyout for all involved. However, purchases can be structured in many ways, with the most common outlined below:

– Perpetual Easement – These transactions are typically for a period of 99 years, with the option to take additional 99-year terms for a small consideration.

– Term Easement – These transactions are for a period from 35 years through 98 years. Term Easements revert the rent back to the Landlord after the expiration of the then-defined term, typically investors take Right or First Refusal provisions that allow them to re-purchase the agreement should the Landlord decide to sell again in the future.

– Fee Simple Purchase – Basically, it's a real estate transaction. Fee Simple or Fee Simple Absolute is the most complete form of ownership. A Fee Simple buyer is given title (ownership) of the property, which includes the land and any improvements to the land in perpetuity.

– Rent Assignment – a.k.a. LPA (Lease Purchase and Assignment) – Rent Assignments are the riskiest form of investment for an investor because these do not grant an Easement on the property to protect the investor's interest in the event of Default. Investors historically try to avoid these types of transactions unless the potential for upside outweighs the risk of the Landlord defaulting on the property.

Three main factors that influence cell tower buyout prices are: current rent, the rent escalator, and the date of lease expiration.

Mass deployment of Fifth Generation cellular technology (5G) has the potential to impact rental income streams paid to property owners, especially in densely populated urban areas where multiple 5G nodes or small cells could render a macrocell site obsolete with emphasis placed on cell sites with higher rental payments. This could also affect investors holding portfolios of cellular telecommunication leases in urban areas.

Different types of cell tower lease buyout offers have different implications for landowners. For example, a cell tower lease buyout on farmland is much different than the purchase of a lease on a building rooftop. Some necessary considerations for cell tower lease buyout transactions are:

- Access requirements.
- Tax implications. (easement vs. lease assignment)
- Property redevelopment rights.
- For rooftop sites, how is property damage addressed?

The challenge of selling a cellular leasehold is the acquisition market is highly unregulated. Lease Acquisition agents can modify and deliver information to the landowner to acquire leaseholds at a highly discounted price. Similar to the oil barons of the 1800s, these agents are compensated heavily to obtain these rights, and often the underlying value of expiration and an expanded sale market is shielded from the landowner.
