= Mobile cell sites =

Transportable digital infrastructure

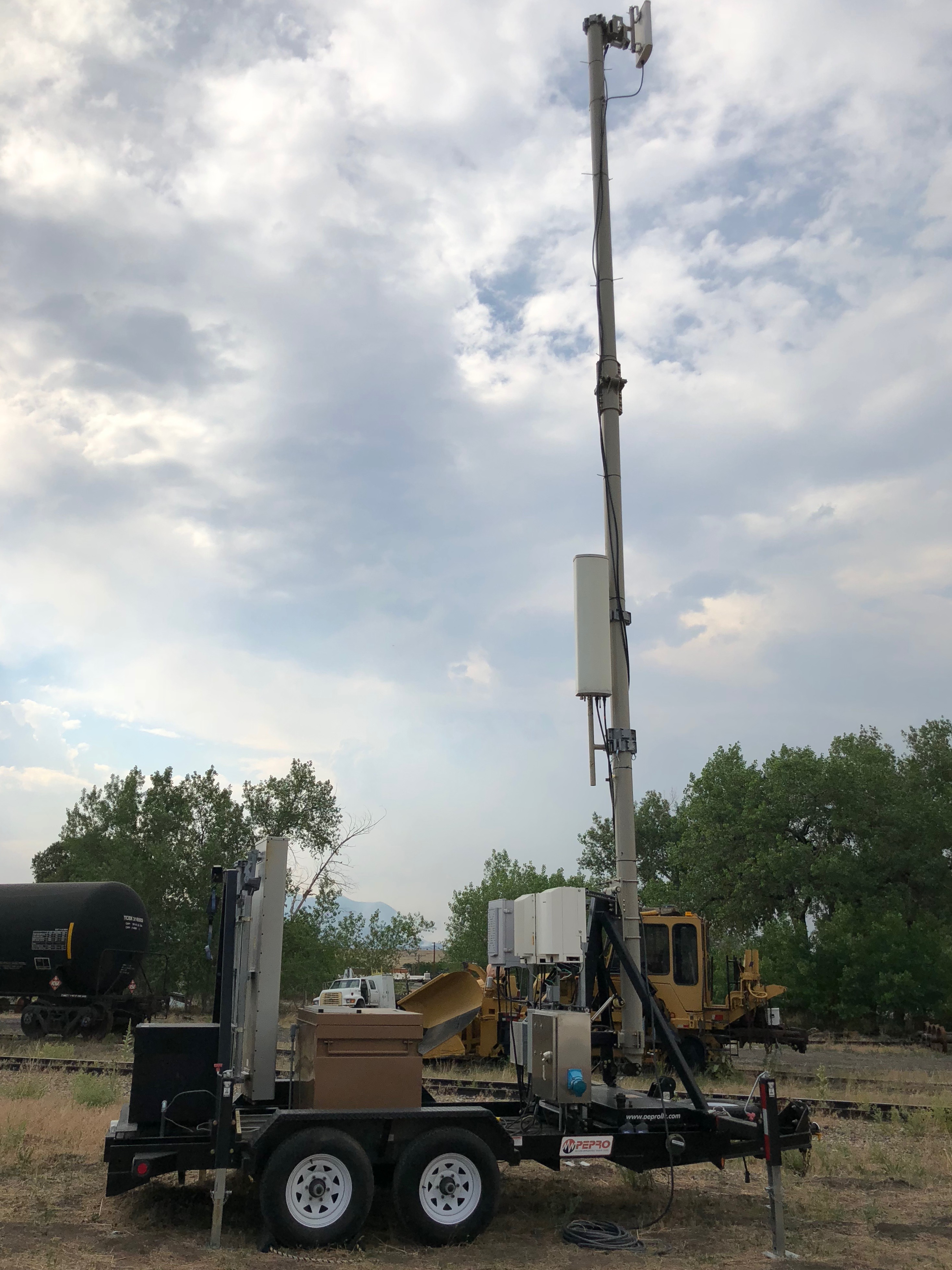
Cell on Wheels (COW) used during the 2018 Spring Creek fire in Huerfano County, Colorado.

Mobile cell sites are infrastructure transportable on trucks, allowing fast and easy installation in restricted spaces. Their use is strategic for the rapid expansion of cellular networks putting into service point-to-point radio connections as well as supporting sudden increases in mobile traffic in the case of extraordinary events (trade fairs, sports events, concerts, emergencies, catastrophic events, etc.). Mobile cell sites are also used by law enforcement organizations to gather intelligence. Mobile cell sites require neither civil works nor foundations, just minimal requirements like commercial power and grounding. The mobile units have been designed to be a temporary solution, but if requested, they can be transformed into permanent stations.

== Different kinds of mobile cell sites ==
There are several different kinds of mobile cell sites, every one of which has different usage characteristics.

=== Rapid-deployment units (RDU) ===
RDUs are mobile radio base stations transportable on trucks. Their use is strategic for the rapid expansion of cellular networks.

- A rapid deployment flanged pole is a mobile radio base station infrastructure transportable on a truck allowing fast and easy installation in restricted spaces. The antenna supporting pole, with a climbing ladder up to the summit, is fixed to the main base frame and is composed of cylindrical flanged sections integrated by two or three sets of guys with a standard height of up to 30 meters. The flanged pole mobile station, installable in eight hours, does not require civil work or foundations, and is complete, including lateral ballast concrete weights and a working platform in checkered plate.
- A radio station kit is an integrated radio base station RDU in which the equipment housing is a special 20" container equipped to contain, during transportation, all the station infrastructure, assembly accessories, radiant systems, storage batteries, and electrical and radio equipment. It is a structure which can be quickly and easily transported and assembled on site, without the need of civil works or foundations and suitable for any environment.
- A rapid deployment compact kitstat is a flanged pole RDU which allows easy and fast erection in narrow sites, without any need of foundation or civil works. The antenna supporting structure, supplied complete with climbing ladder and anchored to the steelwork base frame, is a flanged pole composed of tubular flanged sections with a height of up to 30 m and two or three steel guys.
- A quickrawland with polygonal pole is an RDU which allows an easy and fast erection in narrow sites, without any need of foundation or civil works. It is provided with a polygonal pole with a height of up to 30 m; it has a climbing ladder with a rigid anchor line (EN353-1) and a vertical fixing system for feeders and service cables.

=== Cell on wheels ===
COW in parking lot of the Rose Bowl, Pasadena, California for the 2005 Rose Bowl game, with its own power generator

Cells on wheels (COW), or site on wheels, are telecom infrastructures, placed on trailer approved for road use, towed by heavy goods vehicles for loads of up to 3500 kg. These mobile radio base stations guarantee full operation in just one day and in restricted spaces. COWs provide fully functional service, via vehicles such as trailers, vans and trucks, to areas affected by natural disaster or areas with large user volume, such as major events. The backhaul to the network can be via terrestrial microwave, communication satellite, or existing wired infrastructure.

- Mobile radio base stations with flanged poles are mobile support structures composed of a special trailer with retracting stabilizers approved for road use. The antenna supporting pole, with a climbing ladder up to the summit, is fixed to the main base frame and is composed of cylindrical flanged sections integrated by two or three sets of guys with a standard height of up to 20 meters. The flanged pole mobile station, installable in eight hours, does not require civil work or foundations and is complete with lateral ballast concrete weights and a working platform in checkered plate.
- A rapid deployment self-mounting pole is a mobile supporting structure that corresponds to a special two-axle trailer with telescopic stabilizers approved for road traffic. The antenna supporting pole, with a standard height of up to 20 m, is made of aluminium and consists of three telescopic tubular elements. Installation is easy and fast and is carried out with manual winches.
- Another RDU is a mobile cell site with a self-mounting pole that can be towed by heavy goods vehicles for loads of up to 7500 kg. The antenna supporting pole, with a standard height of up to 20 m, is made of aluminium and consists of three telescopic tubular elements. Installation is easy, fast and is carried out by means of manual winches.
- A mobile station on a trailer is a mobile station with a telescopic mast. They are portable structures, towed by heavy goods vehicles for loads of up to 12000 kg. The antenna supporting pole, with a standard height of up to 30 m, is made of steel and consists of three telescopic tubular elements. Installation is easy, fast and is carried out with manual or electric winches.

==== Expanded or emergency service ====
COWs are used to provide expanded cellular network coverage and/or capacity for short-term demands, such as at special events such as major sporting events (Super Bowl, World Series, Rose Bowl), major conventions, or in disaster areas where cellular coverage either was minimal, never present (e.g., in a wilderness area where firefighters have set up a command center during a major forest fire) or was compromised by the disaster (e.g., in the Gulf Coast after Hurricane Katrina).

Following the September 11 attacks on New York City in 2001, 36 cellular COWs were deployed by September 14, 2001, in Lower Manhattan to support the U.S. Federal Emergency Management Agency (FEMA) and provide critical phone service to rescue and recovery workers.

COWs provided cellular service in Southwest Florida in the aftermath of Hurricane Charley in 2004 when most of the area's stationary cell towers were destroyed. In January 2009, 26 cell-on-wheels units were put in place in Washington, D.C. for the inauguration of Barack Obama to handle the millions of extra people and their calls in the city, especially on and near the National Mall. In January 2017 additional COWs, both temporary, and permanent, have been installed at the National Mall for the inauguration of Donald Trump as well as for future inaugurations and other events due to the steady rise in LTE-based smartphones and other devices in the later half of the 2010s.

Many telecommunications companies also use COWs for long-term placement when financing or infrastructure considerations prevent building a permanent site at the location. For instance, a carrier may have approved the placement of a cell site for coverage reasons, but the remaining budget is inadequate to fund the construction for a fiscal quarter or even longer. An engineering team may be able to place a COW on location to provide immediate coverage with few costs other than leasing, electricity, and backhaul. The decision to use a COW for an extended period of time may also be driven by the property owner. Installations on government or military facilities may be granted only on a temporary basis and may require the use of non-permanent facilities.

=== Cell on truck ===
A cell on truck is a particular kind of mobile cell site that is composed of mobile trucks with a container and with a self-mounting telescopic mast. They are portable structures that guarantee full operation in three hours and in restricted spaces. The steel interface frame is made of galvanized steel beams and is provided with four retracting stabilizers that can be retracted under the container for transport. The equipment and power container, which has a reinforced special 20' box container with two access doors, are divided by an intermediate partition to create two separate rooms (E and A). Room A is used for housing the electrical and radio equipment. Room E is used as a power room for housing the generating set and also, during transport, to contain the radiant systems and accessory components. The antenna supporting pole, with a standard height of up to 20 m, is made of aluminium and consists of three telescopic tubular elements. Installation is easy, fast and is carried out with manual winches.

== See also ==
- Cell site
- Radio masts and towers
- Base transceiver station
