= Reference Signal Received Power =

Power measure received by cell towers

Reference Signal Received Power (RSRP) is a measure of the received power level in an LTE or 5G NR cell network. The average power is a measure of the power received from a single reference signal.

== LTE ==
RSRP is used to measure the coverage of the LTE cell on the DL. The UE will send RRC measurement reports that include RSRP values in a binned format. The reporting range of RSRP is defined from −140 to −44 dBm with 1 dB resolution.

The main purpose of RSRP is to determine the best cell on the DL radio interface and select this cell as the serving cell for either initial random access or intra-LTE handover. The RRC measurement reports with RSRP measurement results will be sent by the UE if a predefined event trigger criterion is met.

== See also ==
- Received signal strength indication
- Signal strength in telecommunications
