= Cellular repeater =

Type of bi-directional amplifier

A cellular repeater (also known as cell phone signal booster or cell phone signal amplifier) is a type of bi-directional amplifier used to improve cell phone reception. A cellular repeater system commonly consists of a donor antenna that receives and transmits signal from nearby cell towers, coaxial cables, a signal amplifier, and an indoor rebroadcast antenna.

== Common components ==
=== Donor antenna ===
A "donor antenna" is typically installed by a window or on the roof a building and used to communicate back to a nearby cell tower. A donor antenna can be any of several types, but is usually directional or omnidirectional. An omnidirectional antenna (which broadcast in all directions) is typically used for a repeater system that amplify coverage for all cellular carriers. A directional antenna is used when a particular tower or carrier needs to be isolated for improvement. The use of a highly directional antenna can help improve the donor's signal-to-noise ratio, thus improving the quality of signal redistributed inside a building.

=== Indoor antenna ===
Some cellular repeater systems can also include an omnidirectional antenna for rebroadcasting the signal indoors. Depending on attenuation from obstacles, the advantage of using an omnidirectional antenna is that the signal will be equally distributed in all directions.

=== Motor vehicle antenna ===
When it is raining and the motor vehicle windows are closed a cell phone could lose between 50% and 100% of its reception. To rectify the reception an antenna is placed outside the vehicle and is wired to the inside of the vehicle to another antenna and amplifier to transmit the mobile phone signal to the cell phone inside the vehicle.

=== Signal amplifier ===
Cellular repeater systems include a signal amplifier. Standard GSM channel selective repeaters (operated by telecommunication operators for coverage of large areas and big buildings) have output power around 2 W, high power repeaters have output power around 10 W. The power gain is calculated by the following equation:

$$\quad P_\mathrm{dB} = 10 \log_{10} \left(\frac{P}{P_0} \right) \$$

A repeater needs to secure sufficient isolation between the donor and the service antenna. When the isolation is lower than actual gain plus a margin (of typically 5–15 dB), the repeater may go into in loop oscillation. This oscillation can cause interference to the cellular network.

The isolation may be improved by antenna type selection in a macro environment, which involves adjusting the angle between the donor and service antennas (ideally 180°), space separation (typically the vertical distance in the case of the tower installation between donor and service antenna is several meters), insertion into an attenuating environment (e.g. installing a metal mesh between donor and service antennas), and/or reduction of reflections (no near obstacles in front of the donor antenna such as trees or buildings).

Isolation can be also improved by integrated feature called ICE (interference cancellation equipment) offered in some products (e.g., NodeG, RFWindow). Activation of this feature has a negative impact on internal delay (higher delay => approximately +5 μs up to standard rep. delay) and consequently a shorter radius from donor site. Amplification and filtering introduce a delay (typically between 5 and 15 μs), depending on the type of repeater and features used. Additional distance also adds propagation delay.

== Reasons for weak signal ==
=== Rural areas ===
In many rural areas the housing density is too low to make construction of a new base station commercially viable. Installing a home cellular repeater may remedy this. In flat rural areas the signal is unlikely to suffer from multipath interference.

=== Building construction material ===
Certain construction materials can attenuate cell phone signal strength. Older buildings, such as churches, often block cellular signals. Any building that has a significant thickness of concrete, or a large amount of metal used in its construction, will attenuate the signal. Concrete floors are often poured onto a metal pan, which completely blocks most radio signals. Some solid foam insulation and some fiberglass insulation used in roofs or exterior walls have foil backing, which can reduce transmittance. Energy efficient windows and metal window screens are also very effective at blocking radio signals. Some materials have peaks in their absorption spectra, which decrease signal strength.

=== Building size ===
Large buildings, such as warehouses, hospitals, and factories, often lack cellular reception. Low signal strength also tends to occur in underground areas (such as basements, and in shops and restaurants located towards the centre of shopping malls). In these cases, an external antenna is usually used.

=== Multipath interference ===
Even in urban areas (which usually have strong cellular signals throughout), there may be dead zones caused by destructive interference of waves. These usually have an area of a few blocks and will usually only affect one of the two frequency ranges used by cell phones. This happens because different wavelengths of the different frequencies interfere destructively at different points. Directional antennas can be helpful at overcoming this issue since they may be used to select a single path from several (see Multipath interference for more details).

=== Diffraction and general attenuation ===
The longer wavelengths have the advantage of diffracting more, and so line of sight is not as necessary to obtain a good signal. Because the frequencies that cell phones use are too high to reflect off the ionosphere as shortwave radio waves do, cell phone waves cannot travel via the ionosphere. (See Diffraction and Attenuation for more details).

== Different operating frequencies ==
Repeaters are available for all of the GSM frequency bands. Some repeaters will handle different types of networks (such as multi-mode GSM and UMTS). Repeater systems are available for certain Satellite phone systems, allowing these to be used indoors without a clear line of sight to the satellite.

== Regional approval ==
=== Approval in the US by the FCC ===
It used to be legal to use the low power devices available for home and small scale use in commercial areas (offices, shops, bars, etc.).

On February 20, 2013, the FCC released a Report & Order, thus establishing two Safe Harbors and defining the use of "network safe" consumer boosters on licensed spectrum. The Safe Harbors represent a compromise solution between Technology Manufacturers and Wireless Operators. Only a few companies have a product compatible with the new FCC regulations.

The FCC has defined two types of repeaters:

1. Wide-band (or broadband) signal boosters are usually repeaters that amplify all frequencies from cell phone carriers. Because interferences can be generated from such boosters, the manufacturers who apply to the FCC must limit their gain (among other things), to 65 dB (for the low LTE 700 MHz bands) to 72 dB (for higher frequencies such as AWS). By limiting the system gain, such boosters are only useful when the outdoor signal is relatively high, and need a complex outdoor installation of specific antennas.
2. Carrier specific (or provider specific) signal boosters. These boosters are only designed to boost those frequencies (and signal) that belong to a particular carrier. Usually, such carrier specific boosters do not produce interferences on other carrier's frequencies, and are allowed to have much larger system gains (sometimes 100 dB). In these conditions, such devices boost signal in a larger coverage area, and can still be efficient when outdoor carrier signals are weak, but are only boosting the signal for the carrier it is designed to operate.

These new rules by the FCC were implemented on March 1, 2014.

=== Approval in the UK by Ofcom and the UK market ===
In May 2011, Ofcom stated the following:

Installation or use of repeater devices (as with any radio equipment) is a criminal offence unless two conditions are satisfied:

1. That the equipment is CE marked, indicating that the manufacturer has declared that it complies with all relevant EU regulatory requirements, including the Radio equipment and Telecommunications Terminal Equipment (R&TTE) Directive;
2. That the use of the equipment is specifically authorised in the UK, either via a licence or by regulations made by Ofcom to exempt the use from licensing.

Under WT Act 2006 section 1.15, the wireless act also allows an exemption if the device does not "involve undue interference with wireless telegraphy". This is expected to follow the US-style regulations where a mobile repeater must have protection built in against interference.

Ofcom stated that "Repeater devices transmit or re-transmit in the cellular frequency bands. Only the mobile network operators are licensed to use equipment that transmits in these bands. Installation or use of repeater devices by anyone without a licence is a criminal offence under Section 8 of the WT Act 2006." Repeaters operating in rural and less densely populated areas do not pose a quantifiable problem.

== See also ==
- Base Station Subsystem
- Femtocell – type of cellular repeater
- Home Node B – a femtocell
- Coverage noticer
- Dead zone (cell phone)
- Waves
- Repeater
