= Cell site =

Communications equipment location

Cell towers
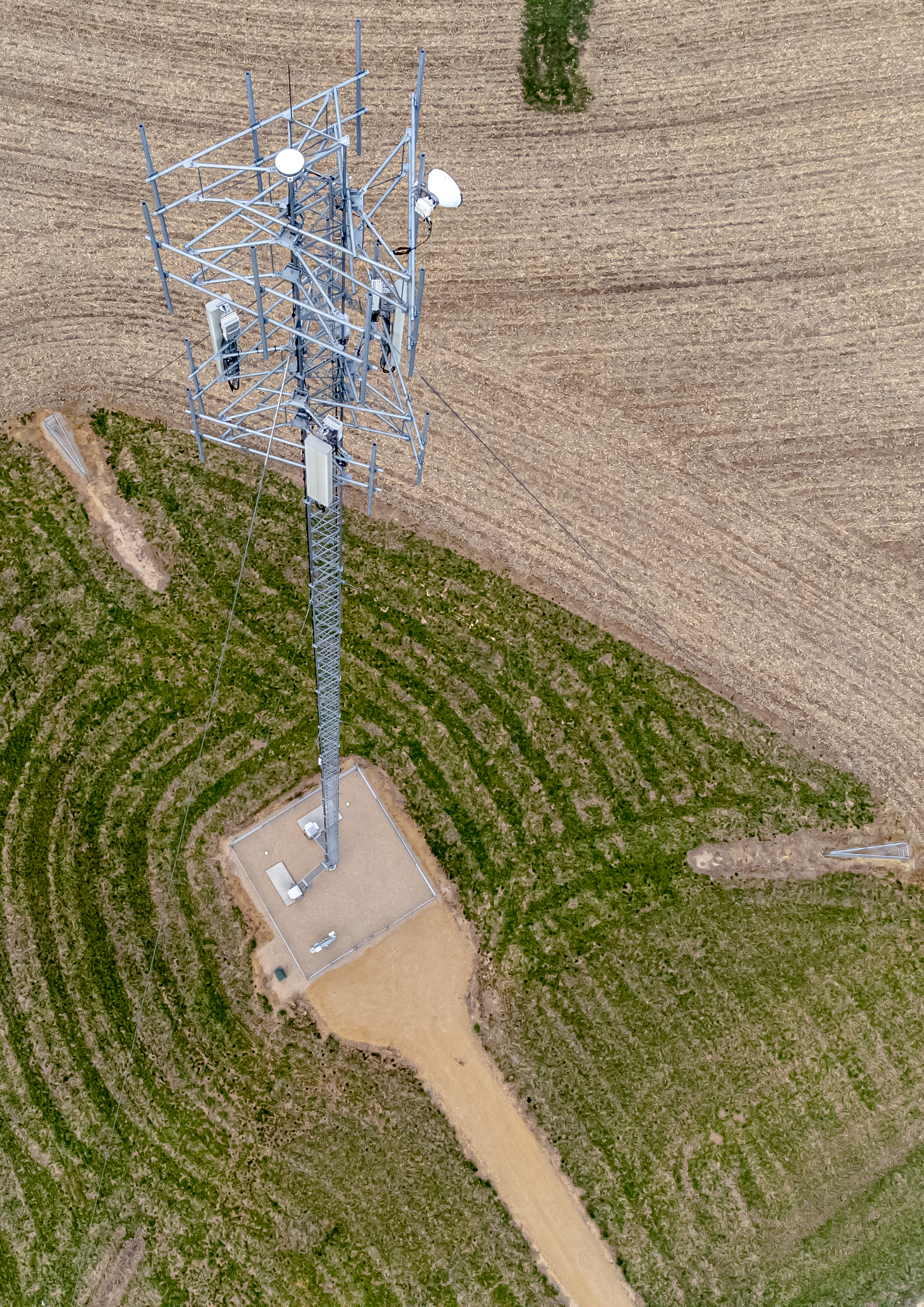
- A typical lattice cell tower with mounted antenna arrays
- Component type: Cellular telephone site
- Working principle: Transceiving of radio frequency (RF) signals to establish wireless telecommunication cells
- Inventor: Douglas H. Ring and W. Rae Young (Bell Labs)
- First produced: 1979 (First commercial cellular networks)
- Pin names: N/A (Macro-infrastructure site)

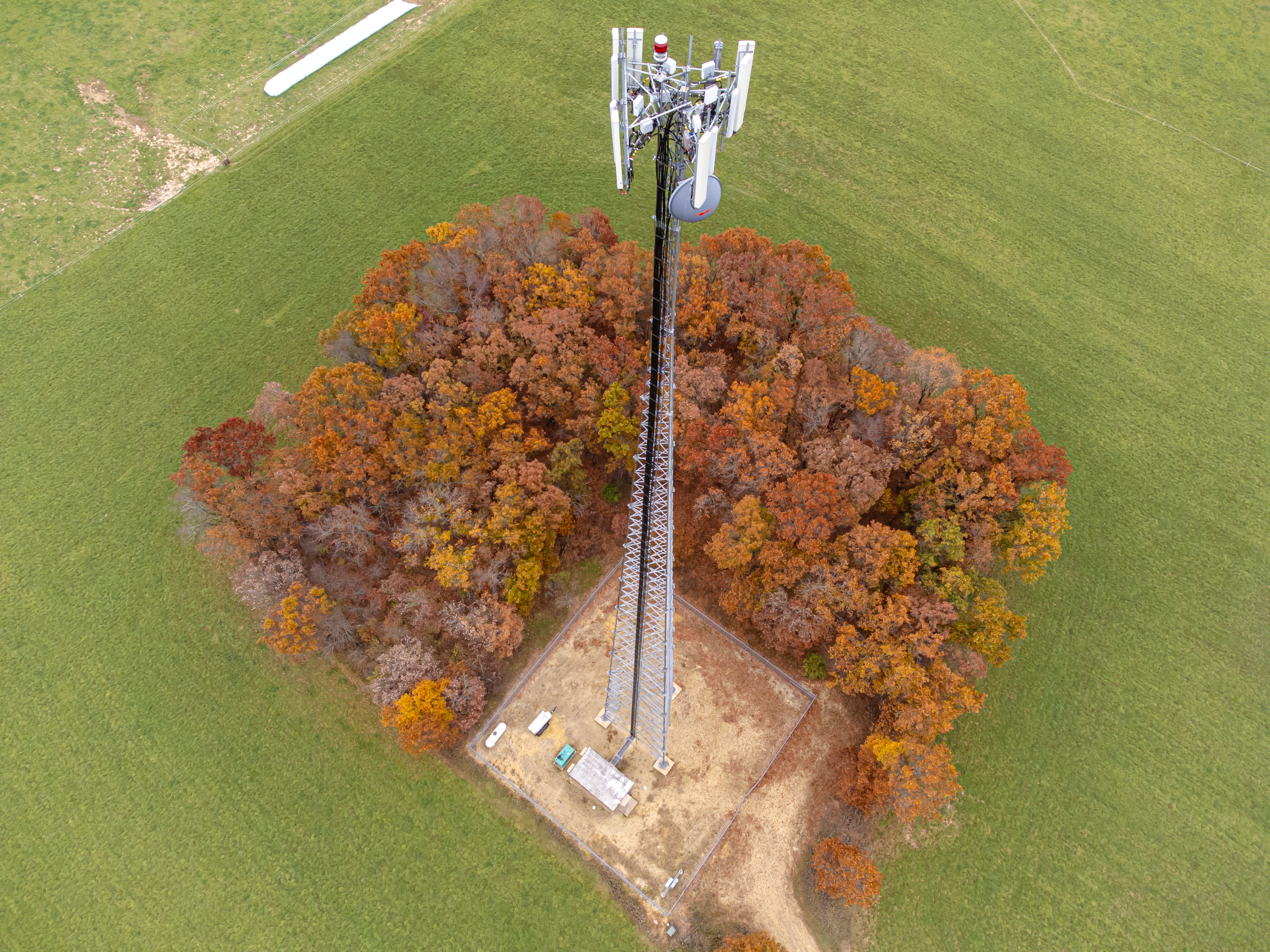
Cellular lattice tower

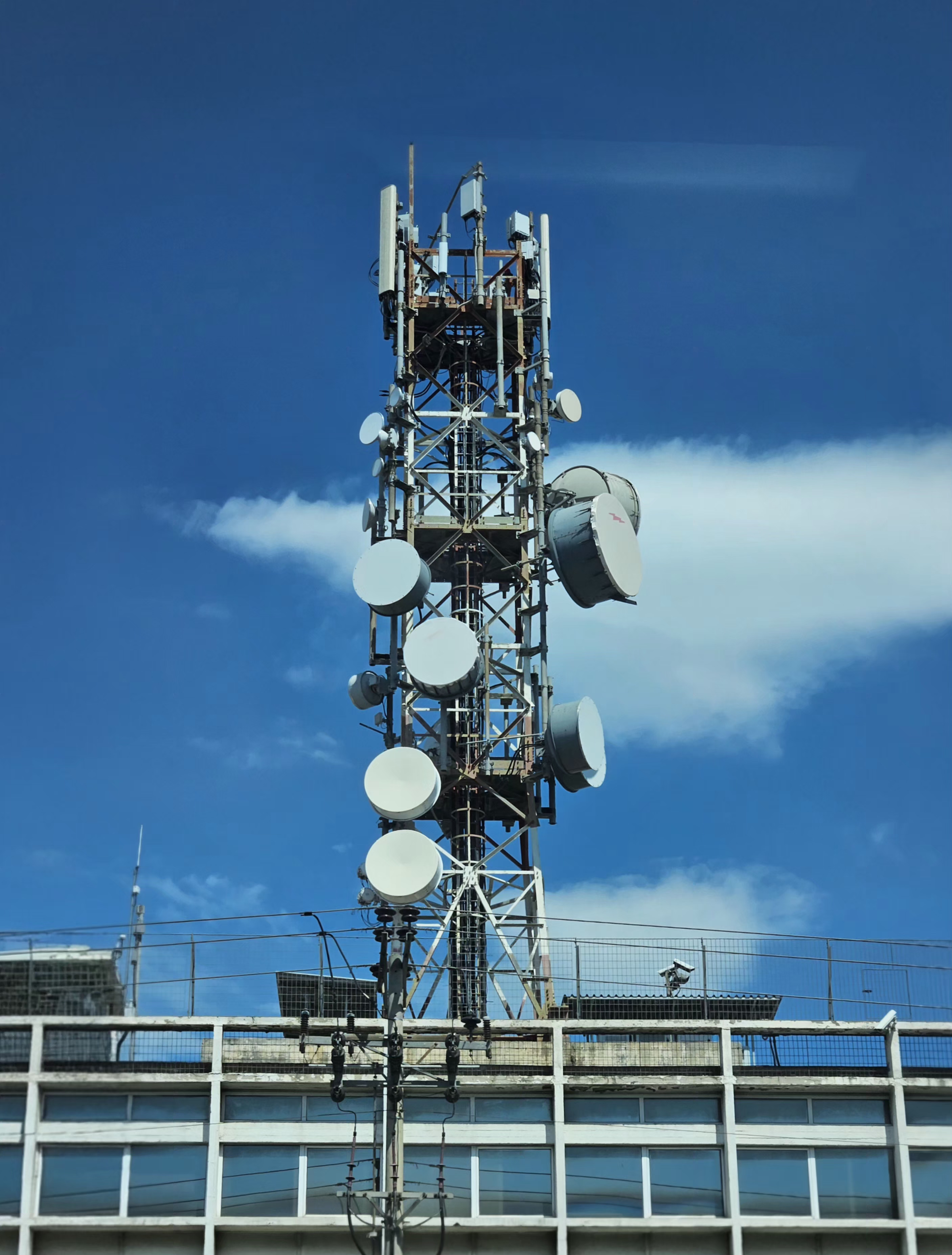
A cell tower in Peristeri, Greece

Antennas of a cellular base station on top of a building in the Netherlands

A cell site, cell phone tower, cell base tower, or cellular base station is a cellular-enabled mobile device site where antennas and electronic communications equipment are placed on a raised structure (typically on a radio mast, or tower) to create a cell, or adjacent cells, in a cellular network. The base station structure typically supports antennae and one or more sets of transmitter/receivers transceivers, digital signal processors, control electronics, a GPS receiver for timing (for CDMA2000/IS-95 or GSM systems), primary and backup electrical power sources, and sheltering.

Some companies provide infrastructure services for cellular networks, including site acquisition, construction, and ongoing maintenance. These third-party providers can manage multiple sites and coordinate network upgrades, helping operators expand coverage efficiently. Such services are offered by companies that specialize in tower management and network support.

Multiple cellular providers often save money by mounting their antennas on a common shared mast; since separate systems use different frequencies, antennas can be located close together without interfering with each other. Some provider companies operate multiple cellular networks and similarly use colocated base stations for two or more cellular networks, (CDMA2000 or GSM, for example).

Cell sites are sometimes required to be inconspicuous; they may be blended with the surrounding area, mounted on buildings or advertising towers. Preserved treescapes can often hide cell towers inside an artificial or preserved tree. These installations are generally referred to as concealed or stealth cell sites.

== Overview ==
A cellular network is a network of handheld mobile phones (cell phones) in which each phone communicates with the telephone network by radio waves through a local antenna at a cellular base station (cell site). The coverage area in which service is provided is divided into a mosaic of small geographical areas called "cells", each served by a separate low power multichannel transceiver and antenna at a base station (Sector antenna). All the cell phones within a cell communicate with the system through that cell's antenna, on separate frequency channels assigned by the base station from a common pool of frequencies used by the system.

The purpose of cellular organization is to conserve radio bandwidth by frequency reuse; the low power radio signals used within each cell do not travel far beyond the cell, so the radio channels can be reused in geographically separated cells. When a mobile user moves from one cell to another, their phone is automatically "handed off" to the new cell's antenna, and assigned a new set of frequencies, and subsequently communicates with this antenna. This background handoff process is imperceptible to the user and can occur in the middle of a phone call without any service interruption. Each cell phone has an automated full duplex digital transceiver and communicates with the cell antenna over two digital radio channels in the UHF or microwave band, one for each direction of the bidirectional conversation, plus a control channel which handles registering the phone with the network, dialing, and the handoff process.

Typically, a cell tower is located at the edge of one or more cells and covers multiple cells using directional antennas. A common geometry is to locate the cell site at the intersection of three adjacent cells, with three antennas at 120° angles each covering one cell. The type of antenna used for cellular base stations (vertical white rectangles in pictures), called a sector antenna, usually consists of a vertical collinear array of dipoles. It has a flat, fan-shaped radiation pattern, that is tilted slightly downward to cover the cell area, avoiding radiation at higher angles that could interfere with distant cells reusing the same frequencies. The elevation angle of the antenna must be carefully adjusted, so the beam covers the entire cell without radiating too far. In modern sector antennas beam tilt can usually be adjusted electronically, to avoid the necessity of a lineman climbing the tower to mechanically tilt the antenna when adjustment is needed.

== Operation ==
=== Range ===
The working range of a cell site (the range which mobile devices connects reliably to the cell site) is not a fixed figure. It will depend on a number of factors, including:

- Height of antenna over surrounding terrain (Line-of-sight propagation).
- The frequency of signal in use.
- The transmitter's rated power.
- The required uplink/downlink data rate of the subscriber's device
- The directional characteristics of the site antenna array.
- Reflection and absorption of radio energy by buildings or vegetation.
- Being limited by local geographical or regulatory factors and weather conditions.
- Timing limitations in some technologies (e.g., even in free space, GSM would be limited to 150 km, with 180 km being possible with special equipment)

Generally, in areas where there are enough cell sites to cover a wide area, the range of each one will be set to:

- Ensure there is enough overlap for "handover" to/from other sites (moving the signal for a mobile device from one cell site to another, for those technologies that can handle it - e.g. making a GSM phone call while in a car or train).
- Ensure that the overlap area is not too large, to minimize interference problems with other sites.

In practice, cell sites are grouped in areas of high population density, with the most potential users. Cell phone traffic through a single site is limited by the base station's capacity; of -56 dBm signal there is a finite number of calls or data traffic that a base station can handle at once. This capacity limitation is commonly the factor that determines the spacing of cell mast sites. In suburban areas, masts are commonly spaced 2–3 kilometres (1.2–1.9 miles) apart and in dense urban areas, masts may be as close as 400–800 metres apart.

The maximum range of a mast (where it is not limited by interference with other masts nearby) depends on the same considerations. In any case the limiting factor is the ability of a low-powered personal cell phone to transmit back to the mast. As a rough guide, based on a tall mast and flat terrain, it may be possible to get between 50 and 70 kilometres (31 and 43 mi). When the terrain is hilly, the maximum distance can vary from as little as 6 to 8 kilometres (3.7 to 5.0 mi) due to encroachment of intermediate objects into the wide center Fresnel zone of the signal. Depending on terrain and other circumstances, a GSM Tower can replace between 3 and 80 km (2 and 50 mi) of cabling for fixed wireless networks. In addition, some technologies, such as GSM, have an additional absolute maximum range of 35 km (22 mi), which is imposed by technical limitations. CDMA and IDEN have no such limit defined by timing.

==== Practical example of range ====
- 3G/4G/5G (FR1) Mobile base station tower: it is technically possible to cover up to 50–150 km. (Macrocell)
- 5G (FR2) Mobile base station: the distances between the 5G base-station is about 250–300 metres, due to the use of millimetre waves.

=== Channel reuse ===
The concept of "maximum" range is misleading in a cellular network. Cellular networks are designed to support many conversations with a limited number of radio channels (slices of radio frequency spectrum necessary to make one conversation) that are licensed to an operator of a cellular service. To overcome this limitation, it is necessary to repeat and reuse the same channels at different locations. Just as a car radio changes from one local station to a completely different local station with the same frequency when traveling to another city, the same radio channel gets reused on a cell mast only a few miles away. To do this, the signal of a cell mast is intentionally kept at low power and in many cases tilted downward to limit its reach. This allows covering an area small enough not to have to support more conversations than the available channels can carry. Due to the sectorized arrangement of antennas on a tower, it is possible to vary the strength and angle for each sector depending on the coverage from other towers in the area.

=== Signal limiting factor ===
A cell phone may not work at times because it is too far from a mast, or because the phone is in a location where cell phone signals are attenuated by thick building walls, hills, or other structures. The signals do not need a clear line of sight but greater radio interference will degrade or eliminate reception. When many people try to use the cell mast at the same time, e.g. during a traffic jam or a sports event, then there will be a signal on the phone display but it is blocked from starting a new connection. The other limiting factor for cell phones is the ability to send a signal from its low powered battery to the cell site. Some cell phones perform better than others under low power or low battery, typically due to the ability to send a good signal from the phone to the mast.

The base station controller (a central computer that specializes in making phone connections) and the intelligence of the cell phone keeps track of and allows the phone to switch from one mast to the next during conversation. As the user moves towards a mast it picks the strongest signal and releases the mast from which the signal has become weaker; that channel on that mast becomes available to another user.

=== Geolocation ===
Cellular geolocation is less precise than by GNSS (e.g. GPS), but it is available to devices that do not have GPS receivers and where the GNSS is not available. The precision of this system varies and is highest where advanced forward link methods are possible and is lowest where only a single cell site can be reached, in which case the location is only known to be within the coverage of that site.

An advanced forward link is where a device is within range of at least three cell sites and where the carrier has implemented timing system use.

Another method is using angle of arrival (AoA) and it occurs when the device is in range of at least two cell sites, produces intermediate precision. Assisted GPS uses both satellite and cell phone signals.

In the United States, for emergency calling service using location data (locally called "Enhanced 911"), it was required that at least 95% of cellular phones in use on 31 December 2005 support such service. Many carriers missed this deadline and were fined by the Federal Communications Commission.

=== Radio power and health ===
According to the U.S. Federal Communications Commission: "Measurement data obtained from various sources have consistently indicated that 'worst-case' ground-level power densities near typical cellular towers are on the order of 1 μW/cm^{2} (or 10 mW/m^{2}) or less (usually significantly less)."

Cell phones, cell towers, wi-fi, smart meters, digital enhanced cordless telecommunications phones, cordless phones, baby monitors, and other wireless devices all emit non-ionizing radio frequencies, which the World Health Organization (WHO) has classified as a "potential" carcinogen, According to the U.S. National Cancer Institute, "No mechanism by which ELF-EMFs or radiofrequency radiation could cause cancer has been identified."

According to the U.S. Food and Drug Administration, "Scientific consensus shows that non-ionizing radiation is not a carcinogen and, at or below the radio frequency exposure limits set by the FCC, non-ionizing radiation has not been shown to cause any harm to people."

== Sites ==
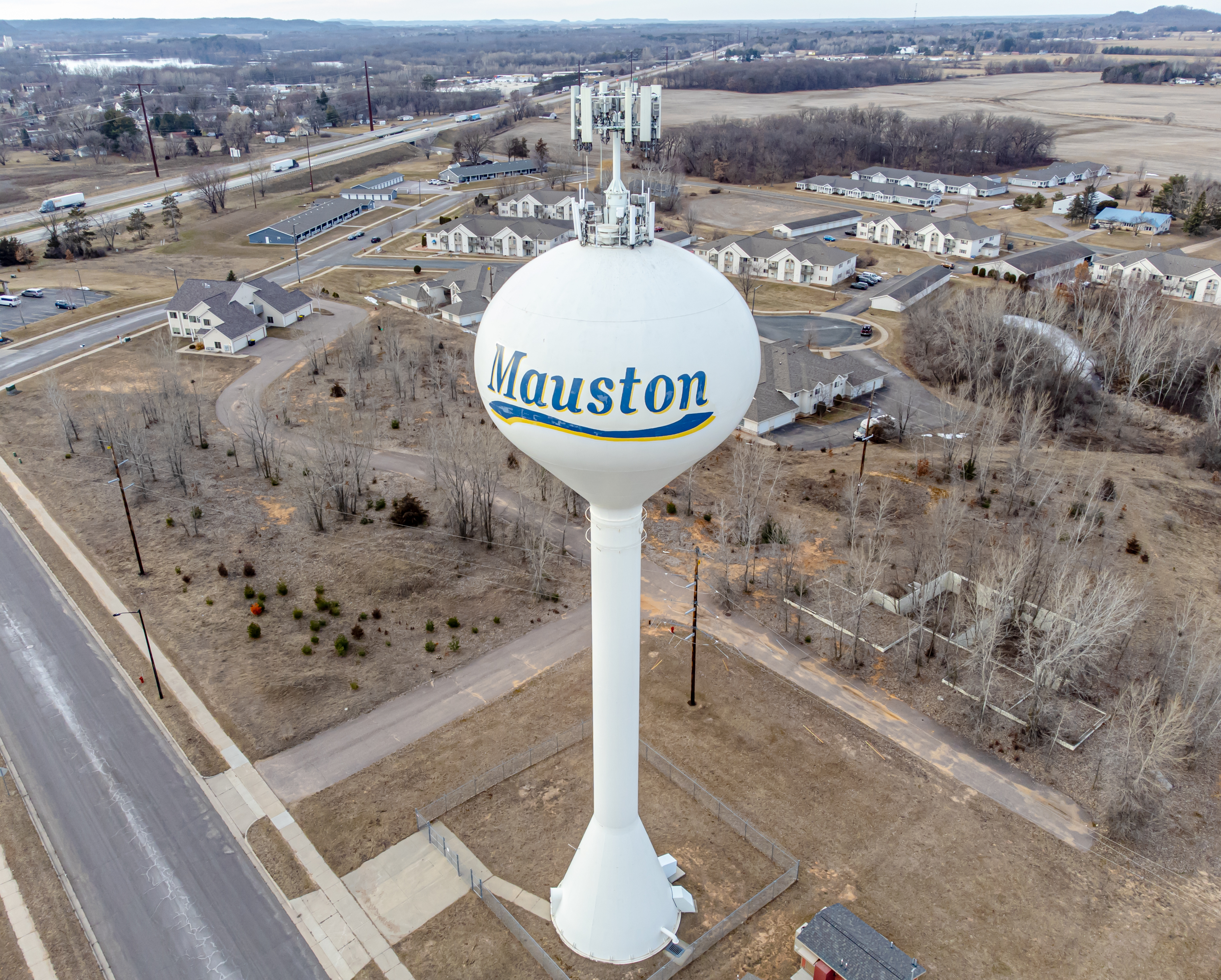
Water tower with cellular tower on top in Mauston, Wisconsin

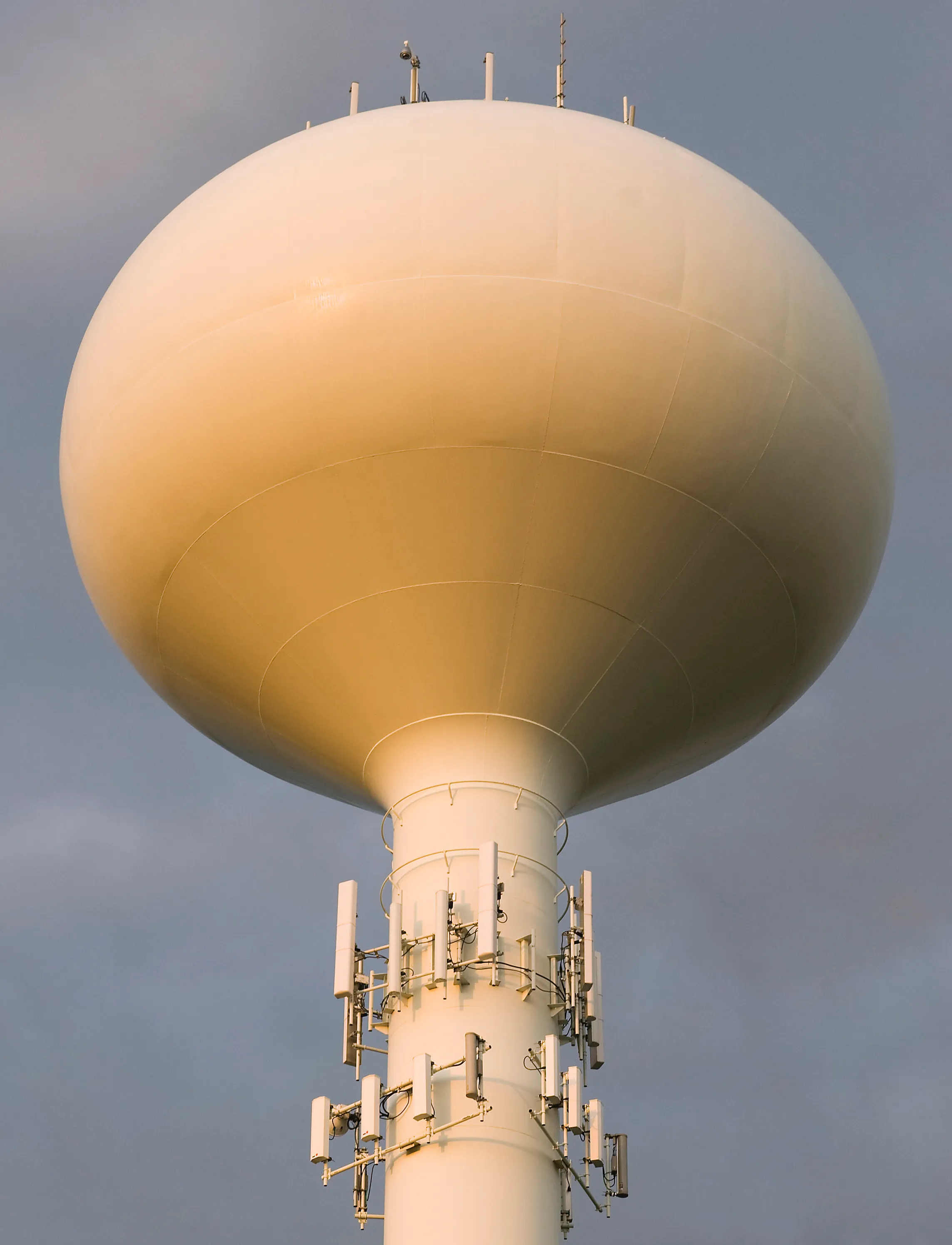
Water tower cellular around the neck in Barrington, Illinois

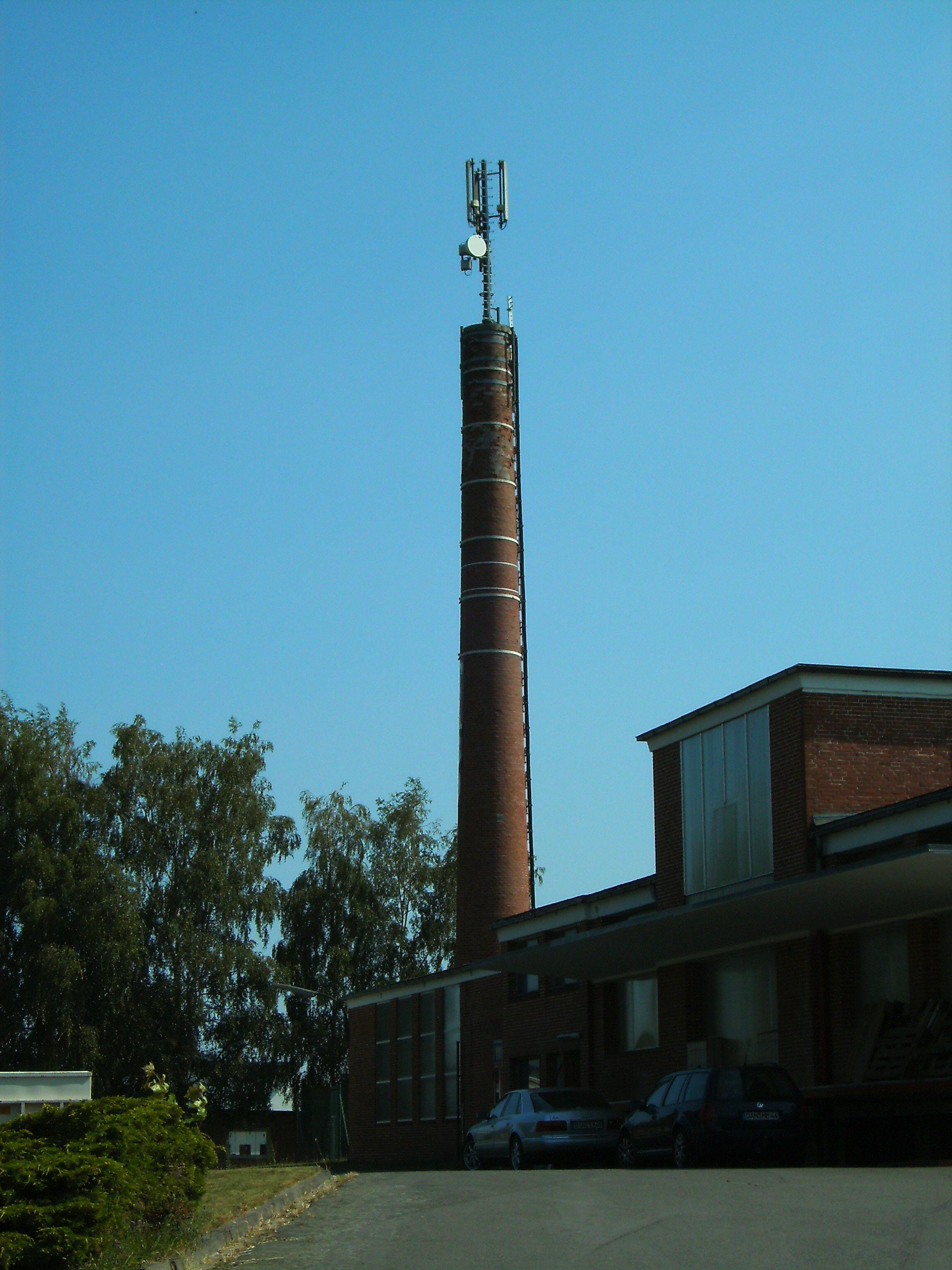
Chimney in Dannenberg, Germany, which is after its modification to a cell site not useable as smokestack any more

Antennas of cell sites can be installed on existing masts, towers and chimneys, if such objects are available and are stable enough to carry them. Sometimes chimneys are modified for cell phone use in a way that they cannot be used as smokestack any more. In urban areas antennas of cell sites are often installed on small masts on the roof of buildings and sometimes even on street lamp posts. It is also possible to install them on the body of electricity pylons far enough from the conductor wires. Cell phone antennas can also be installed on radio towers, which are insulated against ground and have voltage against ground when a transmitter operating on longer wavelengths works. Therefore the antenna cable for the cell phone antenna must be routed through the inside of a blocking coil, which is connected between the ground and the radio mast. This coil, with an appropriate capacitor connected in parallel, blocks the transmission frequency of the transmitter that uses the insulated mast. As however maintenance of cell site antennas is more complicated on energized insulated structures one avoids such installations if possible.

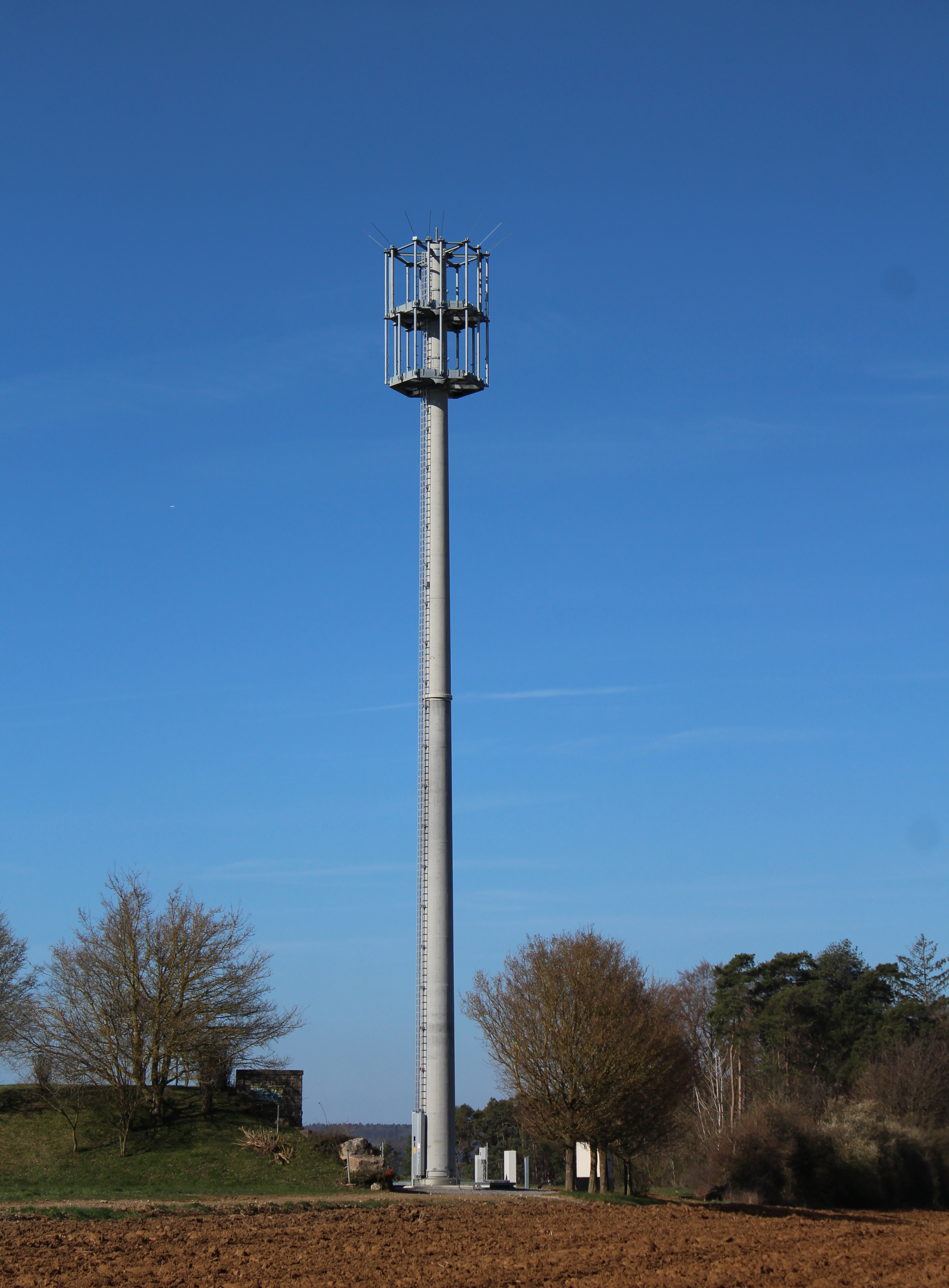
A cellphone tower built of prefabricated concrete in Germany

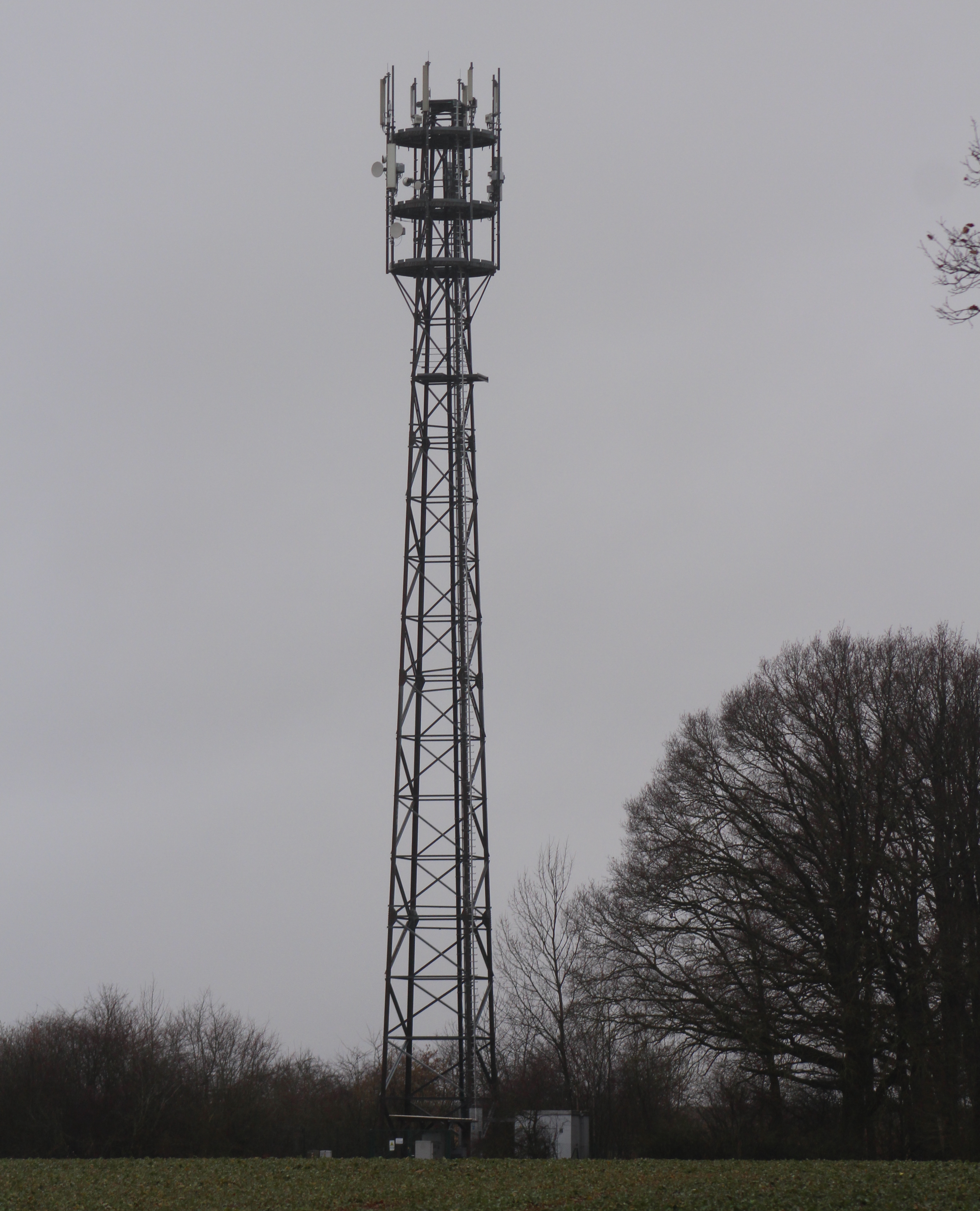
A cellphone tower realized as lattice tower in Germany

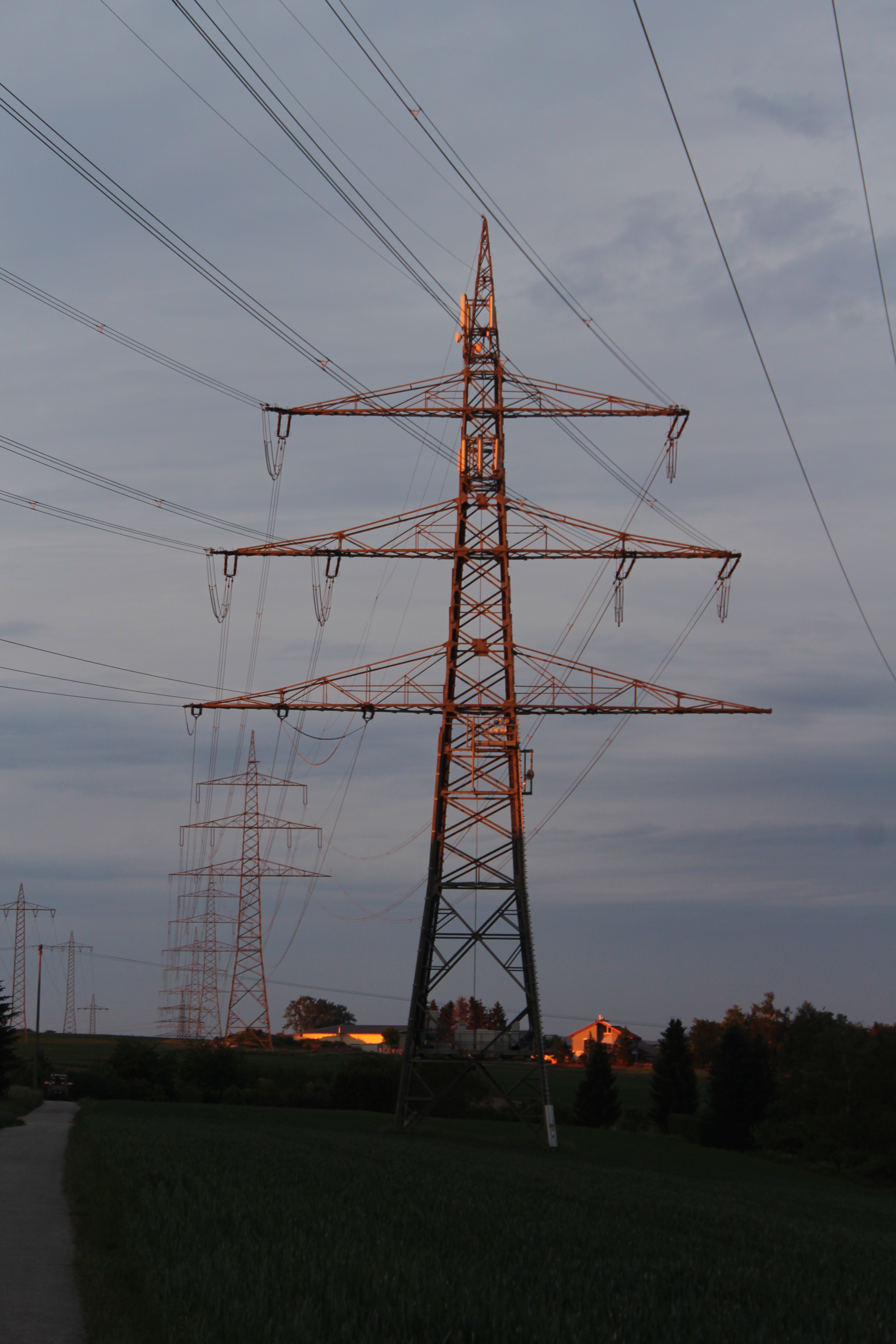
Electricity pylon of a 380 kV/110 kV-line with cellphone antennas in Germany

In many cases the erection of new towers for cellphone sites is necessary. Most of these towers are free-standing steel lattice towers or towers made of prefabricated concrete. Also free-standing tubular towers are used. Guyed masts require more space for their guy foundations and are usually only realized where enough space is available.

=== Special structures ===
==== Wooden structures ====
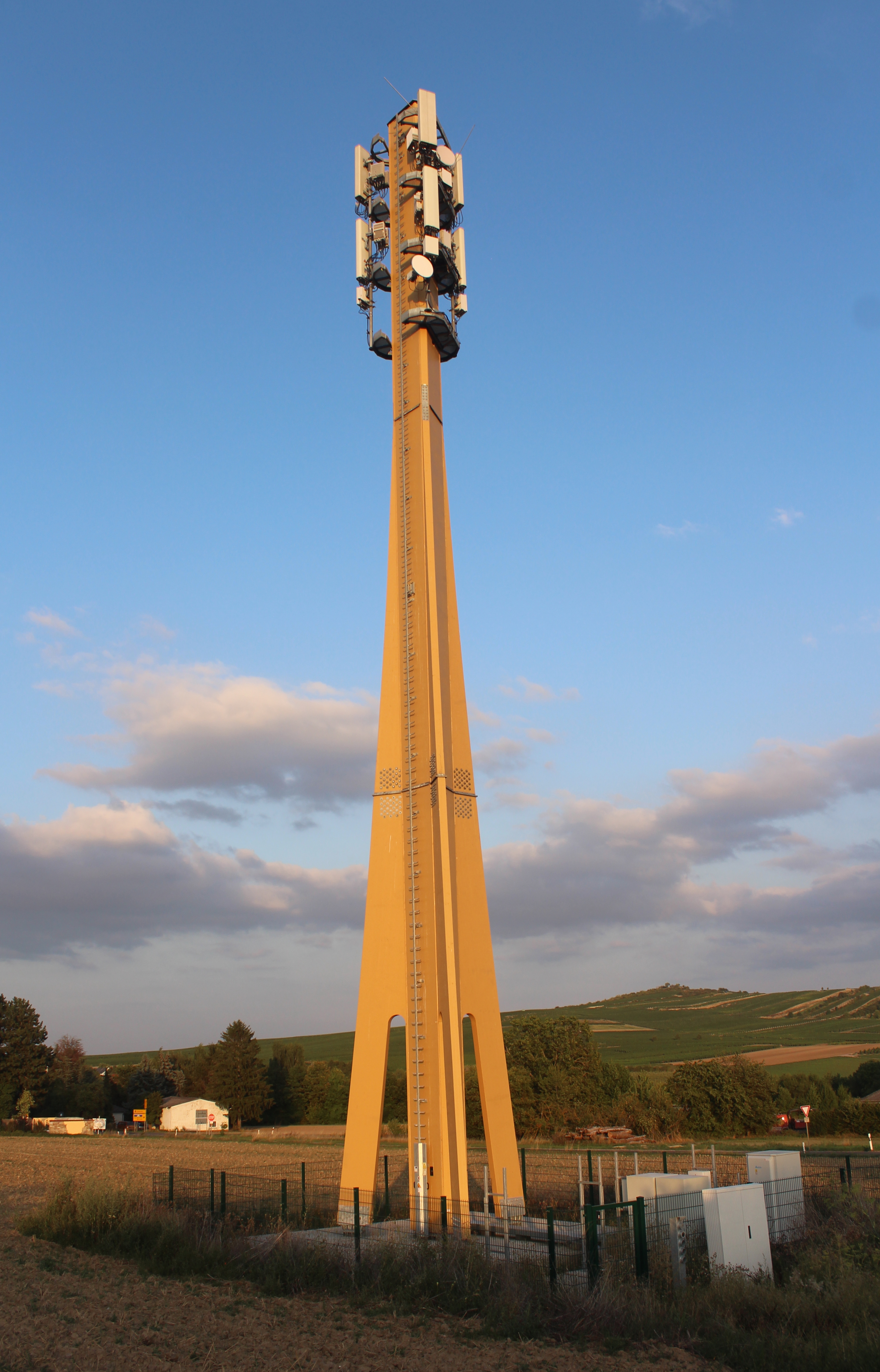
Bechtolsheim Cellphone Transmission Tower – a cellphone tower built of wood

Also a few wooden cellphone towers existed and exist. Beside the historic towers on Grosser Feldberg, Hesse, Germany and Gliwice, Silesia, Poland there exist and existed the following towers built of wood, which were designed as cell site tower.

Structure	Height (m)	Year of completion	Country	City	Coordinates	Notes
Rottenbuch Cellphone Transmission Tower	71	2002	Germany	Peiting, Bavaria	47.757075, 10.931834	demolished in 2026, after a steel tower was built in 2025
Brugherio Cellphone Transmission Tower	40	2021	Italy	Brugherio	45.539128, 9.308835	ECOPOL-Tower
Érd Cellphone Transmission Tower	40	2015	Hungary	Érd	47.401766, 18.869960	ECOPOL-Tower
Podcrkavlje Cellphone Transmission Tower	40	2023	Croatia	Podcrkavlje	45.224079, 17.993138	ECOPOL-Tower
Gradici Cellphone Transmission Tower	40	2015	Croatia	Velika Gorica	45.701724, 16.033092	ECOPOL-Tower
Kisbér Nokia Cellphone Transmission Tower	40	2002	Hungary	Kisbér	47.516335, 17.998728	replaced in 2015 by a steel tower
Surány One Cellphone Transmission Tower	40		Hungary	Pócsmegyer	47.718076, 19.106531	
Pilismarót One Cellphone Transmission Tower			Hungary	Pilismarót	47.798074, 18.875915	
Balatonvilágos One Cellphone Transmission Tower			Hungary	Balatonvilágos	46.983808, 18.167747	replaced in 2016 by a steel tower
Moha Cellphone Transmission Tower			Hungary	Moha	47.249017, 18.340977	replaced by a steel tower
Máriakálnok Cellphone Transmission Tower	40		Hungary	Máriakálnok	47.8600347, 17.3188553	demolished in 2023
Ácsteszér Cellphone Transmission Tower 1	40		Hungary	Ácsteszér	47.399050, 18.003443	
Tóthfalu One Cellphone Transmission Tower	30.5		Hungary	Tahitótfalu	47.761325, 19.084869	
Békés Cellphone Transmission Tower	30	2010	Hungary	Békés	46.761731, 21.143246	ECOPOL-Tower
Bechtolsheim Cellphone Transmission Tower	30	2023	Germany	Bechtolsheim, Rhineland-Palatinate	49.800699, 8.183162	ECOPOL-Tower
Balatonudvari Cellphone Transmission Tower 1	25		Hungary	Balatonudvari	46.898162, 17.787112	replaced in 2023 by a steel tower
Gyenesdiás One Cellphone Transmission Tower			Hungary	Gyenesdiás	46.766129, 17.299787	replaced in 2022 by a steel tower
Vashegy One Cellphone Transmission Tower			Hungary	Vonyarcvashegy	46.759757, 17.331826	
Balatonakali Cellphone Transmission Tower			Hungary	Balatonakali	46.885425, 17.763353	
Kutyahegy Cellphone Transmission Tower			Hungary	Dunabogdány	47.792995, 19.010771	
Old Cholmeleians Sports Club Cellphone Transmission Tower	20		United Kingdom	London, England	51.633807, -0.235439	
Yakima Summitview Avenue SBA Tower	17.4	2007	United States	Yakima, Washington	46.600331, -120.589266	
Potter Hill Cellphone Transmission Tower	15.24	2013	United Kingdom	Ecclesfield, England	53.470231, -1.504275	
Sprint West Capitol Avenue Tower			United States	Sacramento, California	38.575972, -121.573484	

==== Towers with observation deck ====
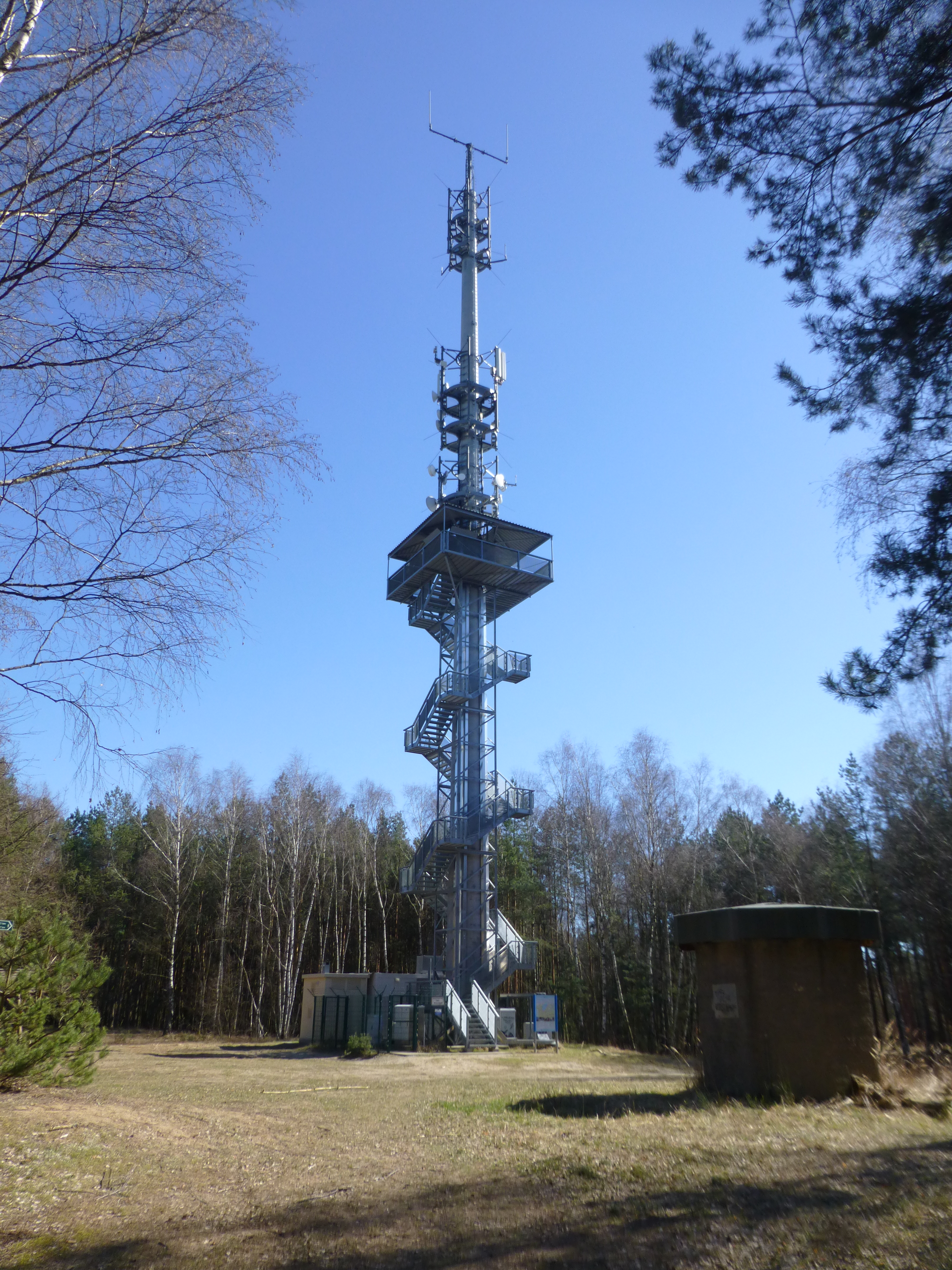
Cellphone tower with observation deck on Wietkiekenberg in Germany

At some sites cellphone towers with observation deck were erected. In opposite to TV towers accessible for the public, their observation deck is accessible by a staircase and not with an elevator. Such towers are usually lattice steel towers, but sometimes pole-type or wooden structures are used.

Structure	Total height (m)	Height observation deck (m)	Year of completion	Country	City	Coordinates	Notes
Schöppinger Berg Cellphone Tower	74 m			Germany	Schöppingen	52.102533, 7.247753	
Góra Donas Observation Tower	70 m	26,5 m	2004	Poland	Gdynia	54.469399, 18.437186	
Kanihůra Tower	62.5 m	26.3 m		Czech	Bílov u Fulneku	49.732437, 18.010122	
Melchenberg Tower	60 m	30 m	2002	Germany	Reken	51.839603, 7.039905	
Schomberg Tower	60 m	30 m	2006	Germany	Sundern	51.238193, 8.004248	
Jarník Observation Tower	59.4 m	34.6 m		Czech	Pisek	49.307941, 14.192429	
Stüppel Tower	57 m	30 m	2001	Germany	Bestwig	51.314599, 8.430727	
Weitkiekenberg Tower	55 m	22 m	2012	Germany	Ferch	52.307514, 12.950035	
Bärenberg Tower	54.78 m	29 m	1999	Germany	Zierenberg	51.352162, 9.268046	
Carlshaus Tower	50 m	30 m	1998	Germany	Hasselfelde	51.656516, 10.796894	
Kolibki Tower	50 m	28 m		Poland	Gdynia	54.467035, 18.543020	
Unnenberg Tower	45 m	31 m	2001	Germany	Marienheide	51.064361, 7.610607	
Hubenloch Tower	38 m	25 m	2008	Germany	Villingen	48.058393, 8.453265	
Gipsberg Tower	18 m	9 m		Germany	Sperenberg	52.140379, 13.376243	
Etyek Tower				Hungary	Etyek	47.442660, 18.738320	
Alcsútdoboz Tower				Hungary	Alcsútdoboz	47.412220, 18.584114	

==== Camouflaged sites ====
There is often local opposition to new masts for reasons of safety and appearance. The latter is sometimes tackled by disguising the mast as something else, such as a flag pole, street lamp, or a tree (e.g. palm trees, pine trees, cypress) or rooftop structures or urban features such as chimneys or panels.

These concealed cell sites can distinguish themselves by foliage shape and bark type. The foliage of all these antennas is composed of leaves made of plastic material accurately designed, taking into consideration quantity, shape and array suitable to completely conceal the antennas and all accessory parts in a natural manner. The materials used guarantee absolute radio-electric transparency and resistance to UVA rays. Nicknames include "monopalm" for a monopole disguised as a palm tree or "Pseudopinus telephoneyensis" for a mast disguised as a pine tree. In monopoles, the directional antennas are sometimes hidden in a plastic housing near the top of the pole so that the crossbars can be eliminated.

Rooftop structures such as concealment chimneys or panels, 6 to 12 meters high, may conceal one or more mobile telephone operators on the same station. Roofmask panels can be fixed to existing rooftop structures, restyling them quickly and cheaply.

Camouflaged sites can be also used for transmitting other radio signals in the UHF-/VHF-range. One example is the Basilica of Notre-Dame de Fourvière in Lyon.

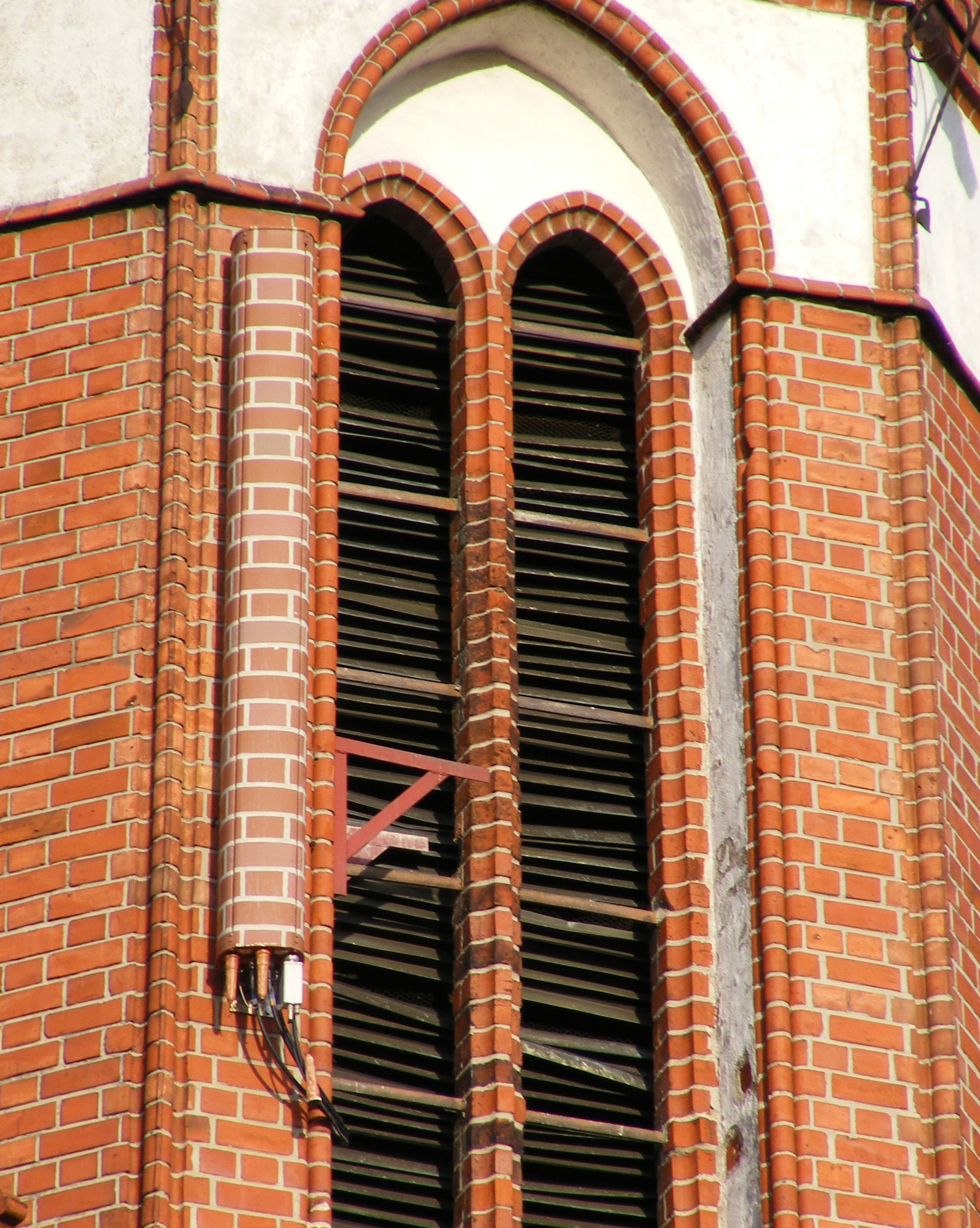
An antenna colored to blend in with its host building, in Sopot, Poland

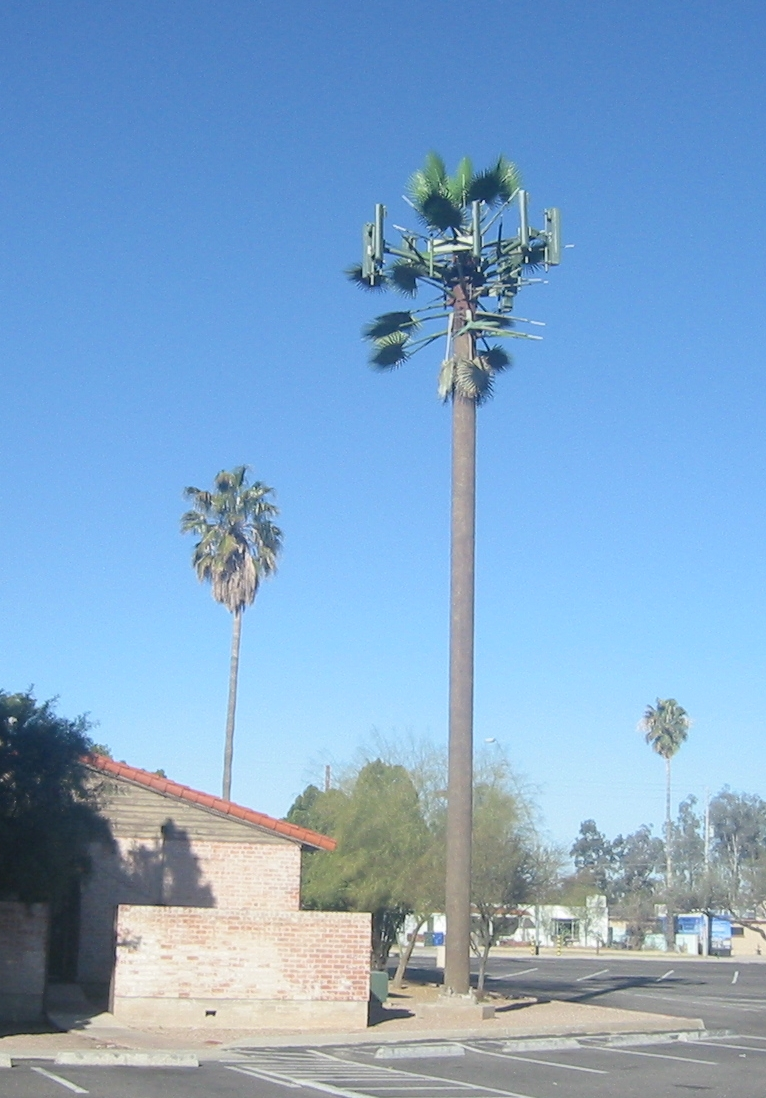
Camouflaged monopole, called "monopalm", in Arizona, US

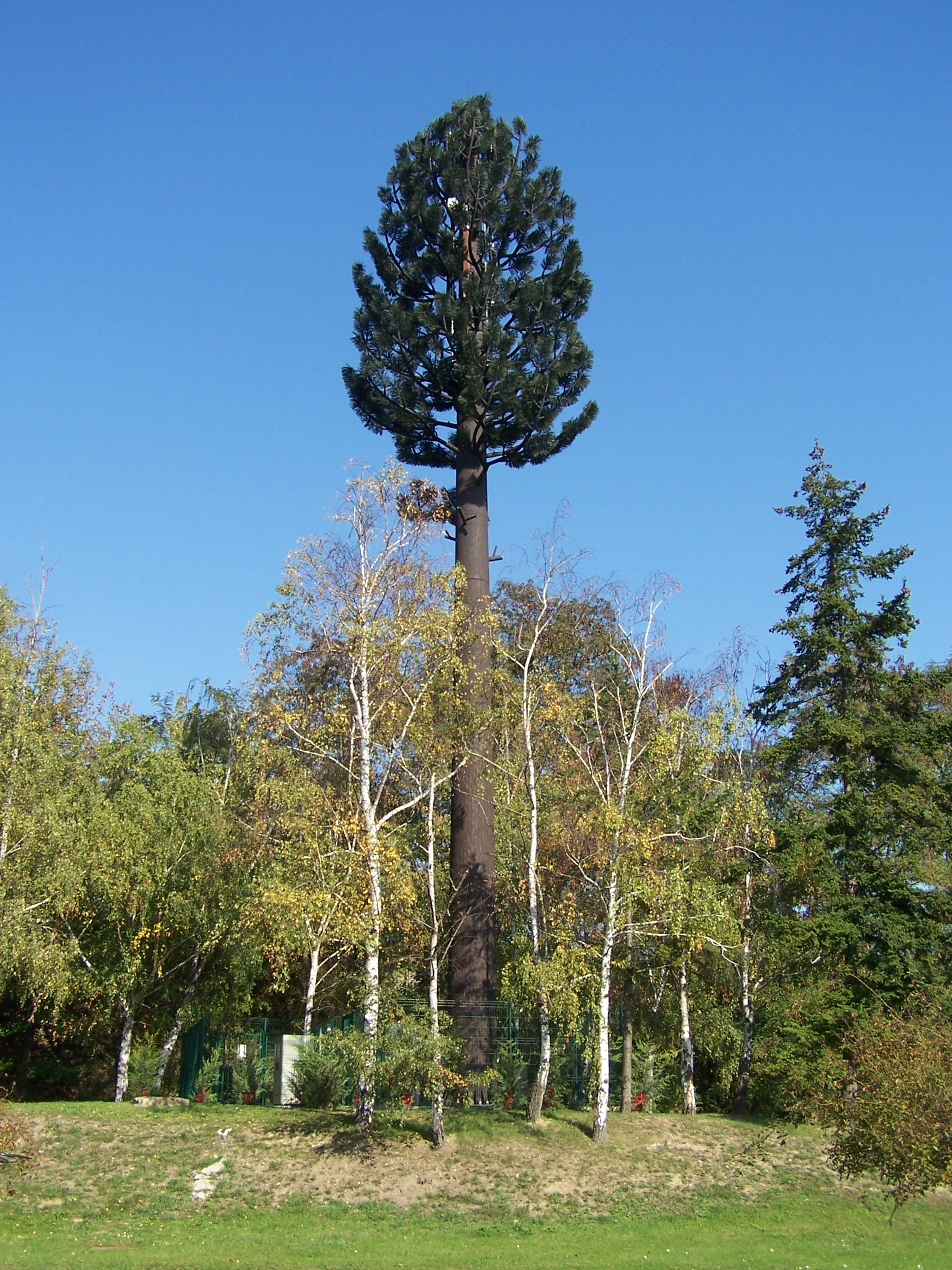
A site concealed as a pine tree, in a stand of trees in Yvelines, France

==== Temporary sites ====
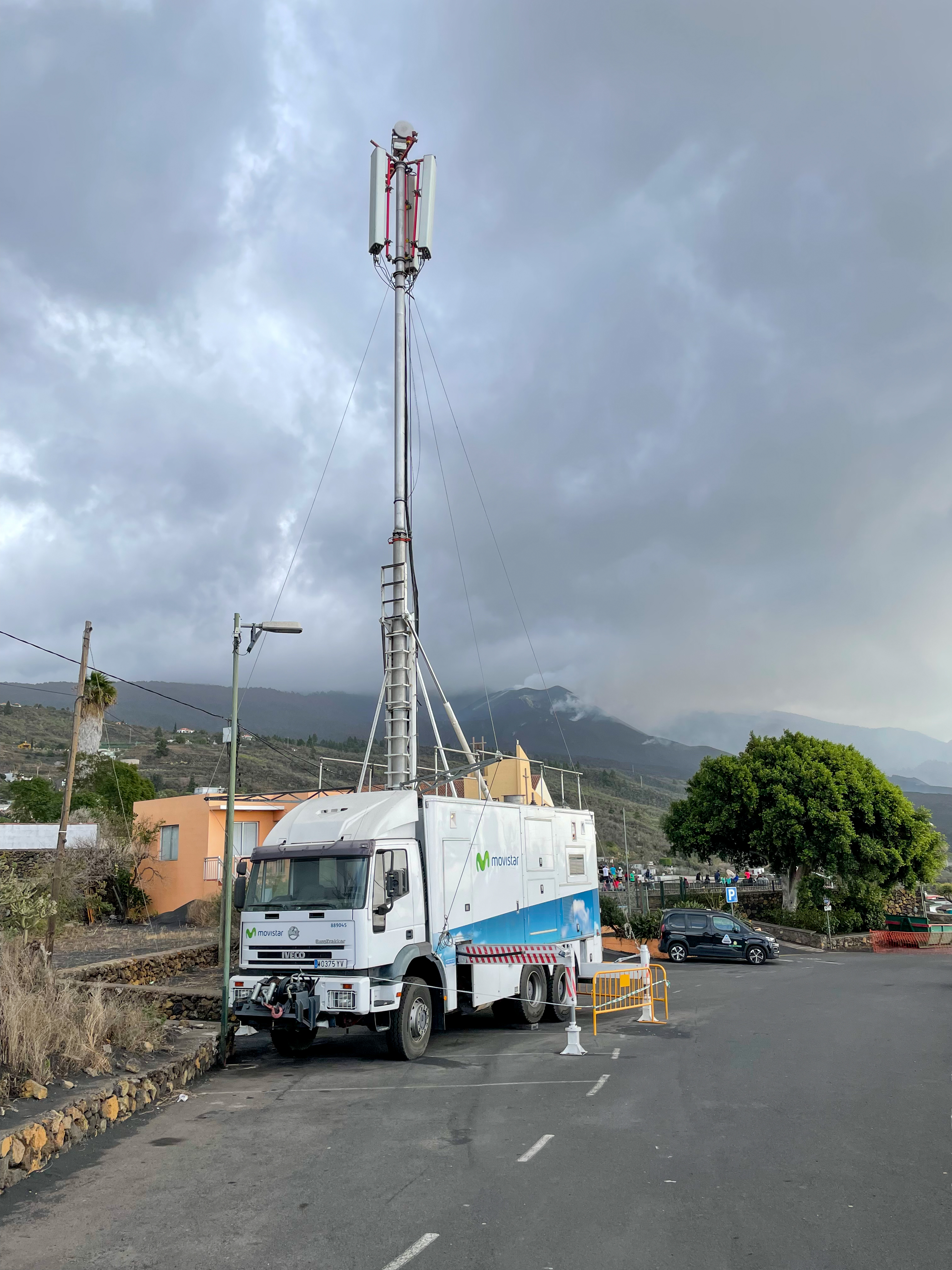
A mobile antenna used during the 2021 Cumbre Vieja volcanic eruption

Although cell antennas are normally attached to permanent structures, carriers also maintain fleets of vehicles, called cells-on-wheels (COWs), that serve as temporary cell sites. A generator may be included for use where network electrical power is not available, and the system may have a wireless backhaul link allowing use where a wired link is not available.

COWs are also used at permanent cell sites—as temporary replacements for damaged equipment, during planned outages, and to augment capacity such as during special events like conventions.

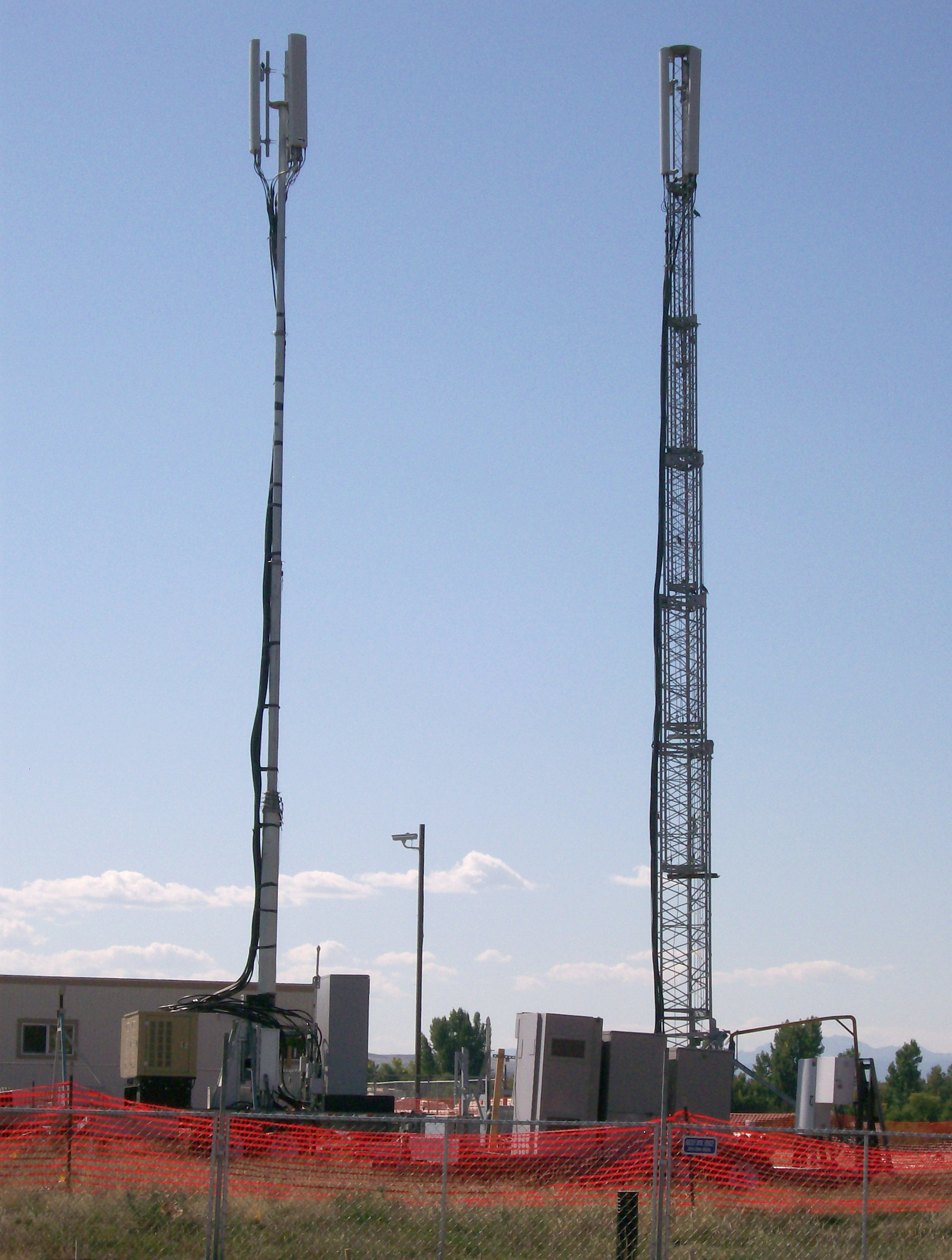
Cell on wheels (COW)

== Power supply ==
Usually cell sites are supplied by the public electricity grid, however in some cases, where the realization of a supply from the electrical grid is too expensive, cell sites with their own power generation, so-called off-grid cell sites were realized. Besides this some important cell sites have a backup power system either in the form of a fuel cell or a combustion engine. The use of an internal-combustion-driven generator set, is less efficient than using power of the public grid, increases operating expense and is a source of pollution (atmospheric, acoustic, etc.), which is especially undesired in areas protected for environment and landscape conservation.

Renewable sources, such as solar power and wind power may be available where cell sites are placed. The first off-grid mast in the UK was installed in 2022 in Eglwyswrw, Wales. This can reduce fuel costs for the cell site or telecom tower by up to 75%. They can be backed up by a fuel generator system which allows the cell site to work when the renewable sources are not enough. One such energy production system consists of:

- Solar power generator
- Wind generator
- Electrochemical fuel-cell generators

Electrical energy from intermittent sources is stored in secondary batteries, which are usually designed to have an average of two days of self-sufficiency, also known as autonomy, to allow time for maintenance personnel to arrive at the site when a repair is needed.

The renewable energy systems supply electrical power when available. The fuel cells are activated only when the natural sources are not enough to meet the system's energy needs. The emergency power supply (the fuel cells) is designed to last an average of ten days. In this way the structure is completely self-sufficient: this enables the maintenance team to make only a few visits to the site, since it is usually hard to get to.

== Employment ==
Cell site workers are called tower climbers or transmission tower workers. Transmission tower workers often work at heights of up to 460 metres (1,500 ft), performing installation, maintenance and repair work for cellular phone and other wireless communications companies.

== Spy agency setup ==
According to documents leaked to Der Spiegel, the NSA sells a $40,000 "active GSM base station" to be used as a tool to mimic a mobile phone tower and thus monitor cell phones.

In November 2014, The Wall Street Journal reported that the Technical Operations Group of the U.S. Marshals utilizes spy devices, known as "dirtboxes", to mimic powerful cell tower signals. Such devices are designed to cause mobile phones to switch over to the tower, as it is the strongest signal within reach. The devices are placed on airplanes to effectively create a "dragnet", gathering data about phones as the planes travel above populated areas.

== Miniature ==
Researchers at Alcatel-Lucent have developed a cell site called lightRadio that fits in the palm of the hand. It is the size of a Rubik's Cube. It is capable of relaying 2G, 3G and 4G signals. They are more energy efficient and deliver broadband more efficiently than current cell sites. They could be used in very populated urban areas to make room for more radio space.

== See also ==
- Cellular network
- Node B
- OpenBTS
- Mobile phone radiation and health
- Telecom infrastructure sharing
- Base transceiver station
- Remote radio head
- Radio masts and towers
- Mobile cell sites
- Distributed antenna system
- Telecommunications lease
- Title 47 of the Code of Federal Regulations
- In re Application of the United States for Historical Cell Site Data
- Tower climber
