= Heterogeneous network =

Network connecting computers with different operating systems or protocols

In computer networking, a heterogeneous network is a network connecting computers and other devices where the operating systems and protocols have significant differences. For example, local area networks (LANs) that connect Windows, Linux and Macintosh computers are heterogeneous.

Heterogeneous network also describes wireless networks using different access technologies. For example, a wireless network that provides a service through a wireless LAN and is able to maintain the service when switching to a cellular network is called a wireless heterogeneous network.

== HetNet ==
Reference to a HetNet often indicates the use of multiple types of access nodes in a wireless network. A wide area network can use some combination of macrocells, picocells, and femtocells in order to offer wireless coverage in an environment with a wide variety of wireless coverage zones, ranging from an open outdoor environment to office buildings, homes, and underground areas. Mobile experts define a HetNet as a network with complex interoperation between macrocell, small cell, and in some cases WiFi network elements used together to provide a mosaic of coverage, with handoff capability between network elements. A study from ARCchart estimates that HetNets will help drive the mobile infrastructure market to account for nearly US$57 billion in spending globally by 2017. Small Cell Forum defines the HetNet as ‘multi-x environment – multi-technology, multi-domain, multi-spectrum, multi-operator and multi-vendor. It must be able to automate the reconfiguration of its operation to deliver assured service quality across the entire network, and flexible enough to accommodate changing user needs, business goals and subscriber behaviors.’

== HetNet architecture ==
From an architectural perspective, the HetNet can be viewed as encompassing conventional macro radio access network (RAN) functions, RAN transport capability, small cells, and Wi-Fi functionality, which are increasingly being virtualized and delivered in an operational environment where span of control includes data center resources associated with compute, networking, and storage.

In this framework, self-optimizing network (SON) functionality is essential to enable order-of-magnitude network densification with small cells. Self-configuration or ‘plug and play’ reduces time and cost of deployment, while self-optimization then ensures the network auto-tunes itself for maximum efficiency as conditions change. Traffic demand, user movements and service mix will all evolve over time, and the network needs to adapt to keep pace. These enhanced SON capabilities will therefore need to take into account the evolving user needs, business goals and subscriber behaviors.

Importantly, functions associated with HetNet operations and management take earlier SON capability that may have only been targeted at a single domain or technology, and expand it to deliver automated service quality management across the entire HetNet.

== Wireless ==
A Heterogeneous wireless network (HWN) is a special case of a HetNet. Whereas a HetNet may consist of a network of computers or devices with different capabilities in terms of operating systems, hardware, protocols, etc., an HWN is a wireless network that consists of devices using different underlying radio access technology (RAT).

Several problems still need to be solved in heterogeneous wireless networks such as:

- Determining the theoretical capacity of HWNs
- Interoperability of technology
- Handover
- Mobility
- Quality of service / quality of experience
- Interference between RATs
- Aggregation

An HWN has several benefits when compared with a traditional homogeneous wireless network, including increased reliability, improved spectrum efficiency, and increased coverage. Reliability is improved since when one particular RAT within the HWN fails, it may still be possible to maintain a connection by falling back to another RAT. Spectrum efficiency is improved by making use of RATs, which may have few users, through the use of load balancing across RATs and coverage may be improved because different RATs may fill holes in coverage that any one of the single networks alone would not be able to fill.

== Semantics ==
From a semantic point of view, the heterogeneous network terminology can have different connotations in wireless telecommunications. For instance, it could refer to the paradigm of seamless and ubiquitous interoperability between various multi-coverage protocols (aka, HetNet). Otherwise, it might refer to the non-uniform spatial distribution of users or wireless nodes (aka, spatial inhomogeneity). Therefore, using the term "heterogeneous network" without putting it into context can result in a source of confusion in scientific literature and during the peer-review cycle. In fact, the confusion may be further aggravated, especially in light of the fact that the HetNet paradigm is often also researched from a geometrical angle.

== See also ==
- Open standard
