= Closed subscriber group =

A closed subscriber group (CSG) is a limited set of users with connectivity access to a femtocell. When a femtocell is configured in CSG mode, only those users included in the femtocell's access control list are allowed to use the femtocell resources. On the other hand, a femtocell can be also configured in Open Access mode, in which any user is allowed access to the femtocell.

A closed access femto will accept LAU (Location Area Update) only from a subscriber who is in the ACL (Access Control List) of the femto, the other subscriber, named as Public User, who is not in the ACL will get a reject with a roaming not allowed cause 13 or 15.

== See also ==
- Femtocell, microcell and picocell
