= Base station =

Type of radio station

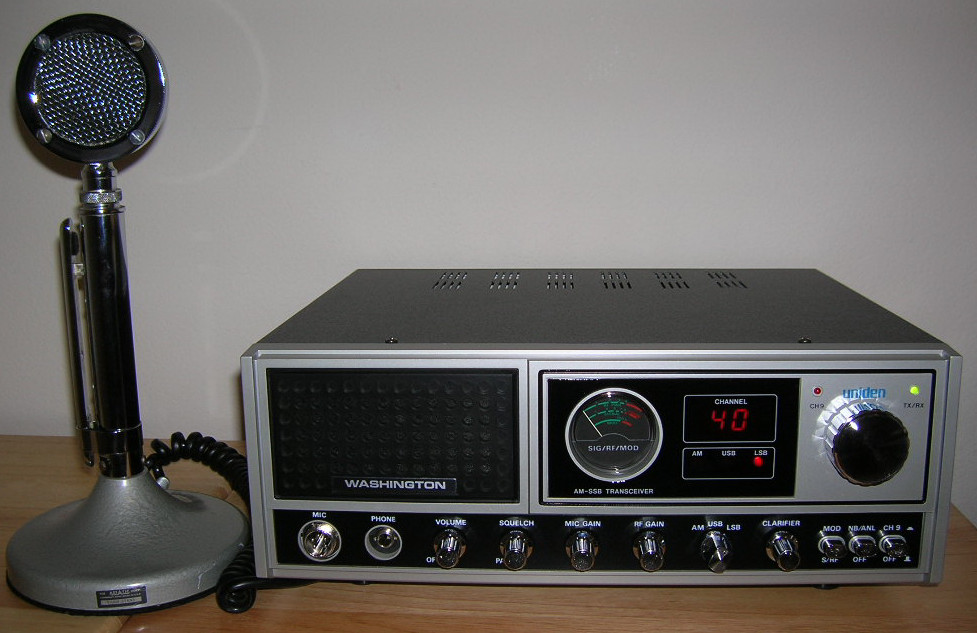
A 1980s consumer-grade citizens' band radio (CB) base station

Base station (or base radio station, BS) is – according to the International Telecommunication Union's (ITU) Radio Regulations (RR) – a "land station in the land mobile service."

A base station is called node B in 3G, eNB in LTE (4G), and gNB in 5G.

The term is used in the context of mobile telephony, wireless computer networking and other wireless communications and in land surveying. In surveying, it is a GPS receiver at a known position, while in wireless communications it is a transceiver connecting a number of other devices to one another and/or to a wider area. In mobile telephony, it provides the connection between mobile phones and the wider telephone network. In a computer network, it is a transceiver acting as a switch for computers in the network, possibly connecting them to a/another local area network and/or the Internet. In traditional wireless communications, it can refer to the hub of a dispatch fleet such as a taxi or delivery fleet, the base of a TETRA network as used by government and emergency services or a CB shack.

== Land surveying ==
In the context of external land surveying, a base station is a GPS receiver at an accurately-known fixed location which is used to derive correction information for nearby portable GPS receivers. This correction data allows propagation and other effects to be corrected out of the position data obtained by the mobile stations, which gives greatly increased location precision and accuracy over the results obtained by uncorrected GPS receivers.

== Computer networking ==
In the area of wireless computer networking, a base station is a radio receiver/transmitter that serves as the hub of the local wireless network, and may also be the gateway between a wired network and the wireless network. It typically consists of a low-power transmitter and wireless router.

== Wireless communications ==
In radio communications, a base station is a Wireless communications station installed at a fixed location and used to communicate as part of one of the following:

- a push-to-talk two-way radio system, or;
- a wireless telephone system such as cellular CDMA or GSM cell site.
- Terrestrial Trunked Radio

Base stations use RF power amplifiers (radio-frequency power amplifiers) to transmit and receive signals. The most common RF power amplifiers are metal–oxide–semiconductor field-effect transistors (MOSFETs), particularly LDMOS (power MOSFET) RF amplifiers. RF LDMOS amplifiers replaced RF bipolar transistor amplifiers in most base stations during the 1990s, leading to the wireless revolution.

=== Two-way radio ===
==== Professional ====
In professional two-way radio systems, a base station is used to maintain contact with a dispatch fleet of hand-held or mobile radios, and/or to activate one-way paging receivers. The base station is one end of a communications link. The other end is a movable vehicle-mounted radio or walkie-talkie. Examples of base station uses in two-way radio include the dispatch of tow trucks and taxicabs.

Basic base station elements used in a remote-controlled installation. Selective calling options such as CTCSS are optional.

Professional base station radios are often one channel. In lightly used base stations, a multi-channel unit may be employed. In heavily used systems, the capability for additional channels, where needed, is accomplished by installing an additional base station for each channel. Each base station appears as a single channel on the dispatch center control console. In a properly designed dispatch center with several staff members, this allows each dispatcher to communicate simultaneously, independently of one another, on a different channel as necessary. For example, a taxi company dispatch center may have one base station on a high-rise building in Boston and another on a different channel in Providence. Each taxi dispatcher could communicate with taxis in either Boston or Providence by selecting the respective base station on his or her console.

In dispatching centers it is common for eight or more radio base stations to be connected to a single dispatching console. Dispatching personnel can tell which channel a message is being received on by a combination of local protocol, unit identifiers, volume settings, and busy indicator lights. A typical console has two speakers identified as select and unselect. Audio from a primary selected channel is routed to the select speaker and to a headset. Each channel has a busy light which flashes when someone talks on the associated channel.

Base stations can be local controlled or remote controlled. Local controlled base stations are operated by front panel controls on the base station cabinet. Remote control base stations can be operated over tone- or DC-remote circuits. The dispatch point console and remote base station are connected by leased private line telephone circuits, (sometimes called RTO circuits), a DS-1, or radio links. The consoles multiplex transmit commands onto remote control circuits. Some system configurations require duplex, or four wire, audio paths from the base station to the console. Others require only a two-wire or half duplex link.

The diagram shows a band-pass filter used to reduce the base station receiver's exposure to unwanted signals. It also reduces the transmission of undesired signals. The isolator is a one-way device which reduces the ease of signals from nearby transmitters going up the antenna line and into the base station transmitter. This prevents the unwanted mixing of signals inside the base station transmitter which can generate interference.

Interference could be defined as receiving any signal other than from a radio in your own system. To avoid interference from users on the same channel, or interference from nearby strong signals on another channel, professional base stations use a combination of:

- minimum receiver specifications and filtering.
- analysis of other frequencies in use nearby.
- in the US, coordination of shared frequencies by coordinating agencies.
- locating equipment so that terrain blocks interfering signals.
- use of directional antennas to reduce unwanted signals.

Base stations are sometimes called control or fixed stations in US Federal Communications Commission licensing. These terms are defined in regulations inside Part 90 of the commissions regulations. In US licensing jargon, types of base stations include:

- A fixed station is a base station used in a system intended only to communicate with other base stations. A fixed station can also be radio link used to operate a distant base station by remote control. (No mobile or hand-held radios are involved in the system.)
- A control station is a base station used in a system with a repeater where the base station is used to communicate through the repeater.
- A temporary base is a base station used in one location for less than a year.
- A repeater is a type of base station that extends the range of hand-held and mobile radios.

==== Amateur and hobbyist use ====
In amateur radio, a base station also communicates with mobile rigs but for hobby or family communications. Amateur systems sometimes serve as dispatch radio systems during disasters, search and rescue mobilizations, or other emergencies.

An Australian UHF CB base station is another example of part of a system used for hobby or family communications.

=== Wireless telephone ===
Wireless telephone differ from two-way radios in that:

- wireless telephones are circuit switched: the communications paths are set up by dialing at the start of a call and the path remains in place until one of the callers hangs up.
- wireless telephones communicate with other telephones usually over the public switched telephone network.

A wireless telephone base station communicates with a mobile or hand-held phone. For example, in a wireless telephone system, the signals from one or more mobile telephones in an area are received at a nearby base station, which then connects the call to the land-line network. Other equipment is involved depending on the system architecture. Mobile telephone provider networks, such as European GSM networks, may involve carrier, microwave radio, and switching facilities to connect the call. In the case of a portable phone such as a US cordless phone, the connection is directly connected to a wired land line.

=== Emissions issues ===
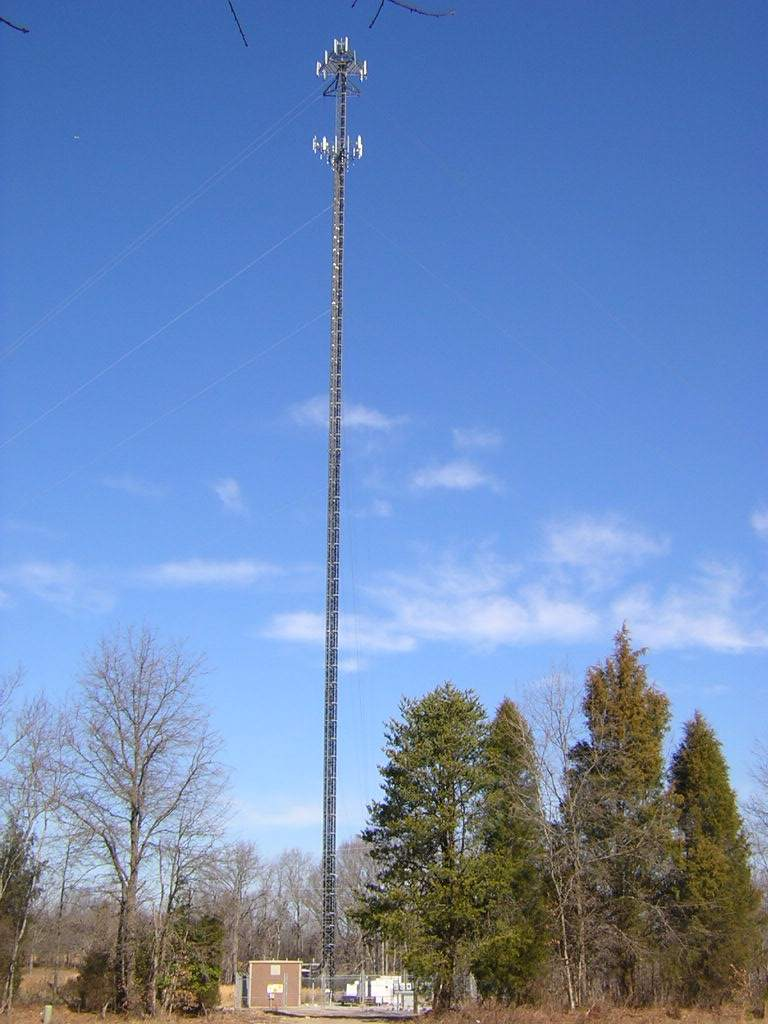
A cell tower near Thicketty, South Carolina

While low levels of radio-frequency power are usually considered to have negligible effects on health, national and local regulations restrict the design of base stations to limit exposure to electromagnetic fields. Technical measures to limit exposure include restricting the radio frequency power emitted by the station, elevating the antenna above ground level, changes to the antenna pattern, and barriers to foot or road traffic. For typical base stations, significant electromagnetic energy is only emitted at the antenna, not along the length of the antenna tower.

Because mobile phones and their base stations are two-way radios, they produce radio-frequency (RF) radiation in order to communicate, exposing people near them to RF radiation giving concerns about mobile phone radiation and health. Hand-held mobile telephones are relatively low power so the RF radiation exposures from them are generally low.

The World Health Organization has concluded that "there is no convincing scientific evidence that the weak RF signals from base stations and wireless networks cause adverse health effects."

The consensus of the scientific community is that the power from these mobile phone base station antennas is too low to produce health hazards as long as people are kept away from direct access to the antennas. However, current international exposure guidelines (ICNIRP) are based largely on the thermal effects of base station emissions, NOT considering the non-thermal effects harmless.

=== Emergency power ===
Fuel cell backup power systems are added to critical base stations or cell sites to provide emergency power.

== Media ==
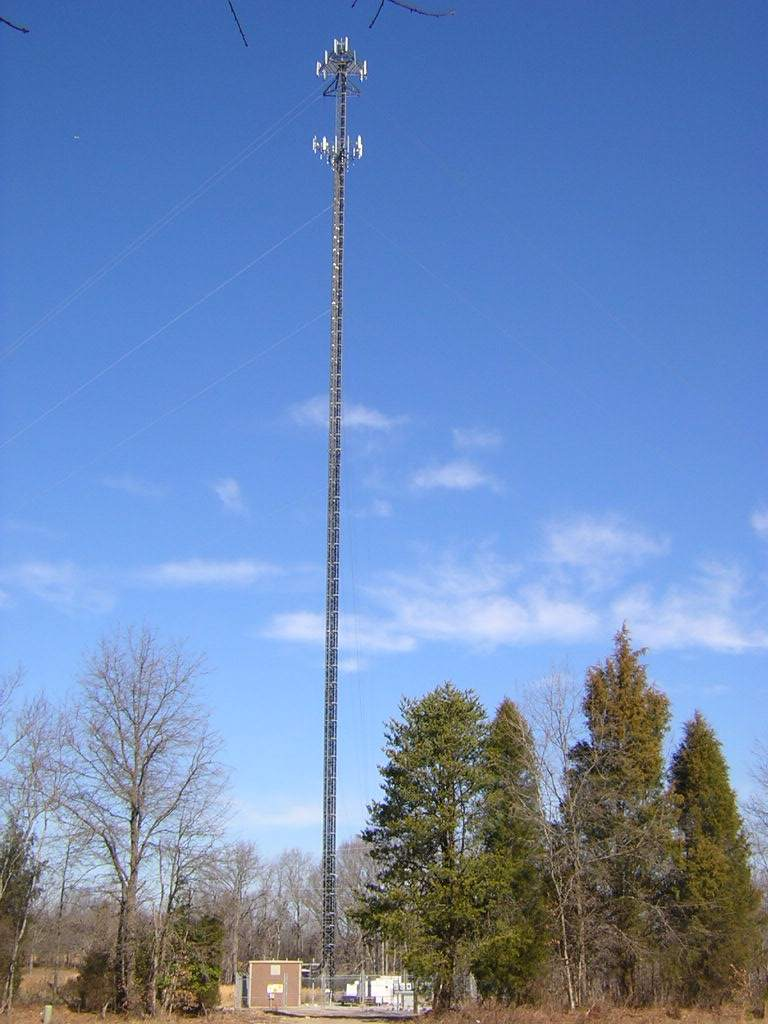
A cell tower near Thicketty, South Carolina.

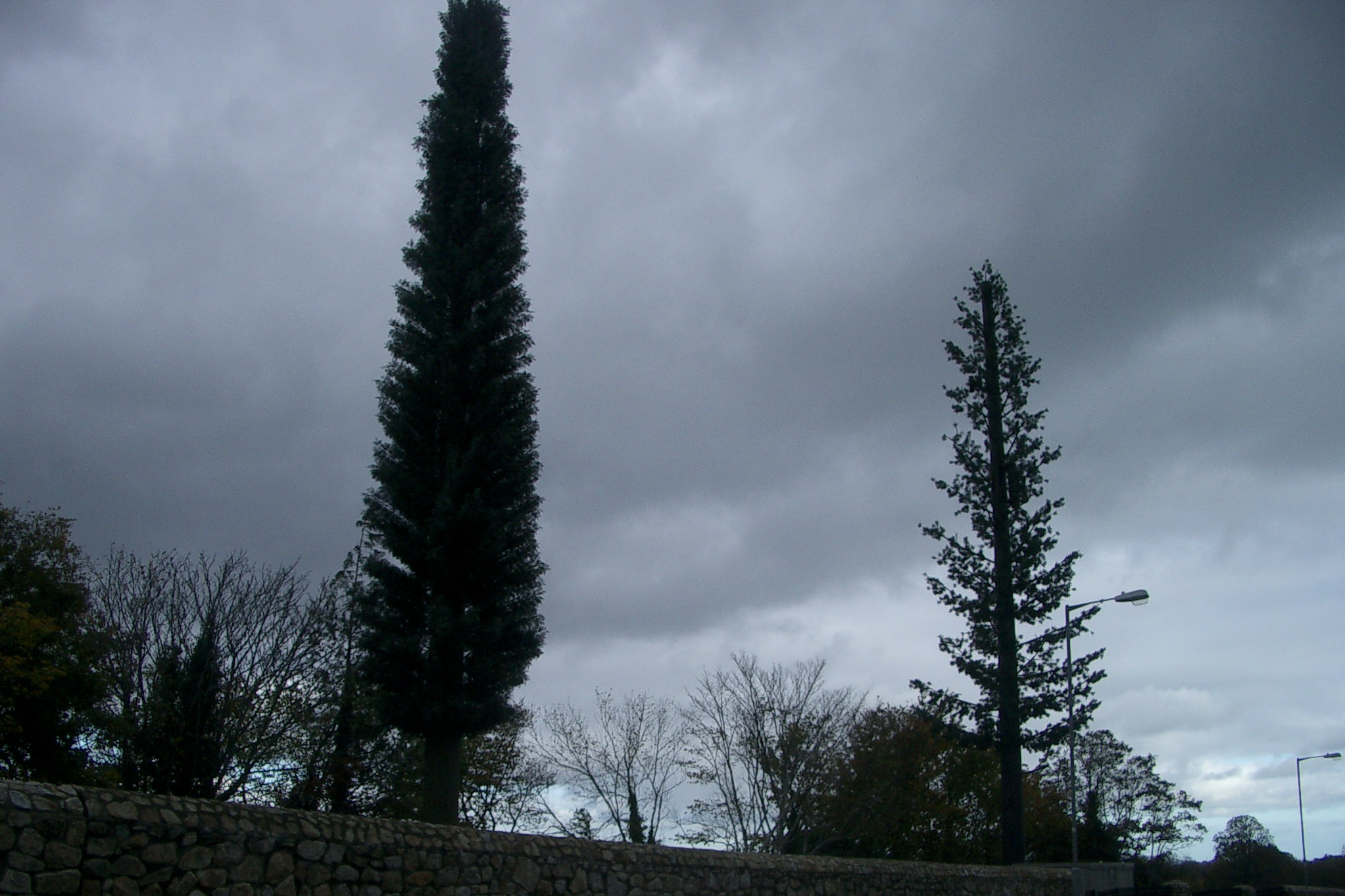
Two GSM mobile phone base station towers disguised as trees in Dublin, Ireland.

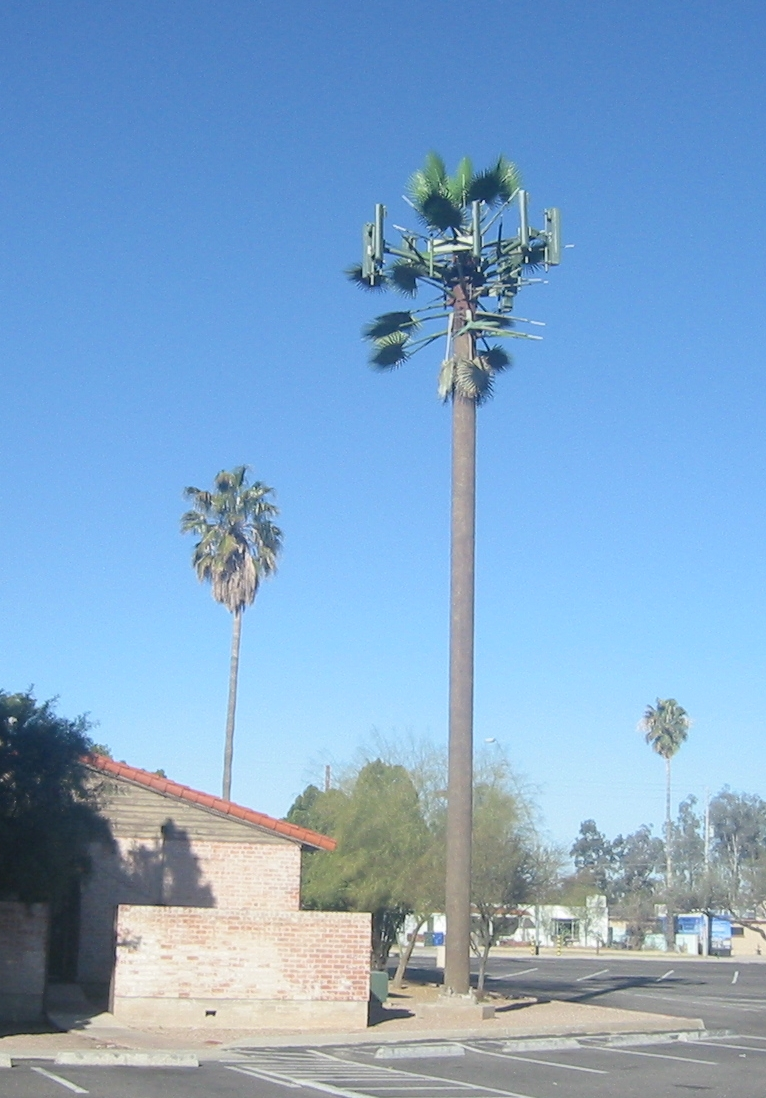
A base station disguised as a palm tree in Tucson, Arizona.

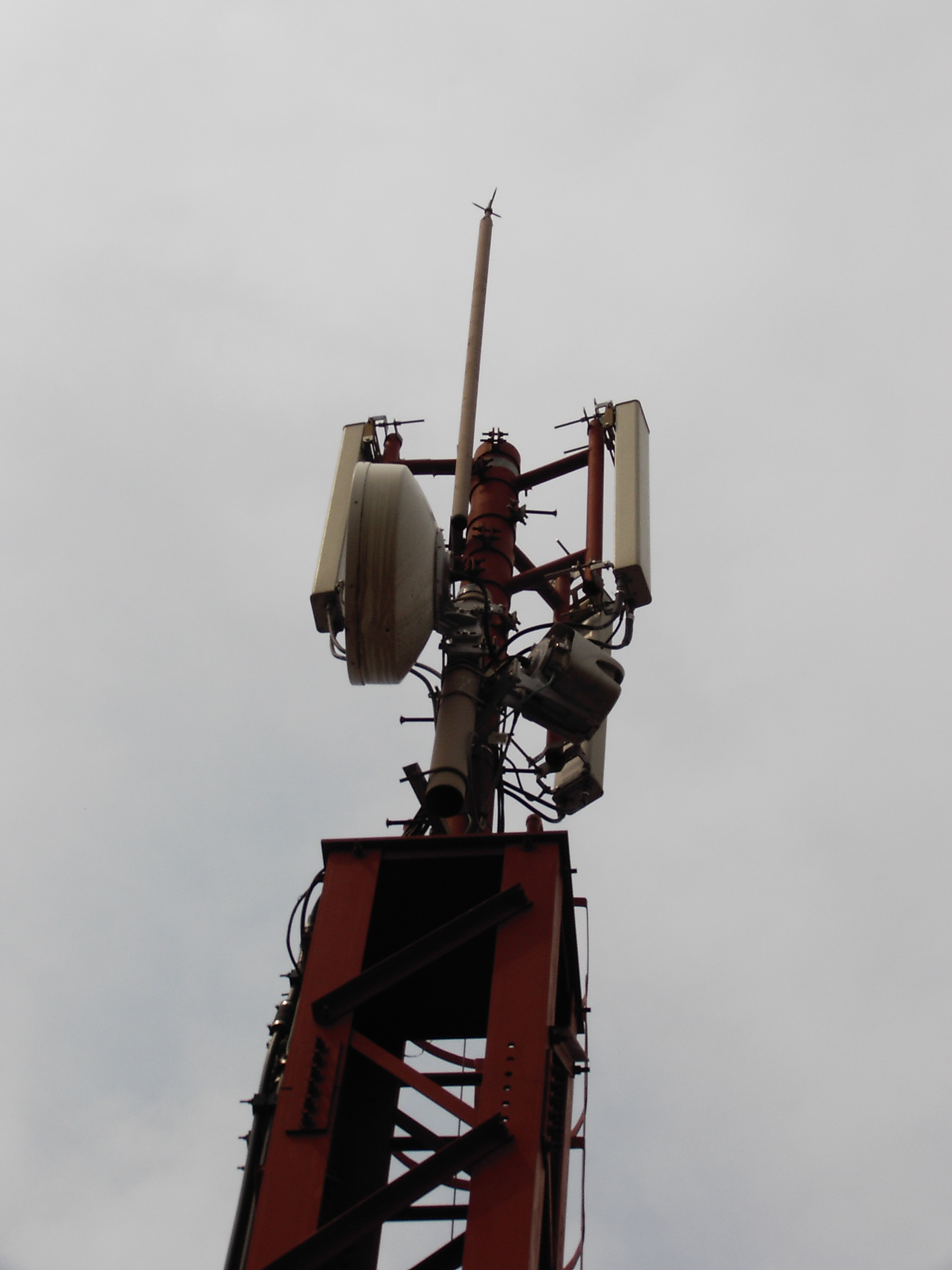
Close-up of a base station antenna in Mexico City, Mexico. There are three antennas: each serves a 120-degree segment of the horizon. The microwave dish links the site with the telephone network.

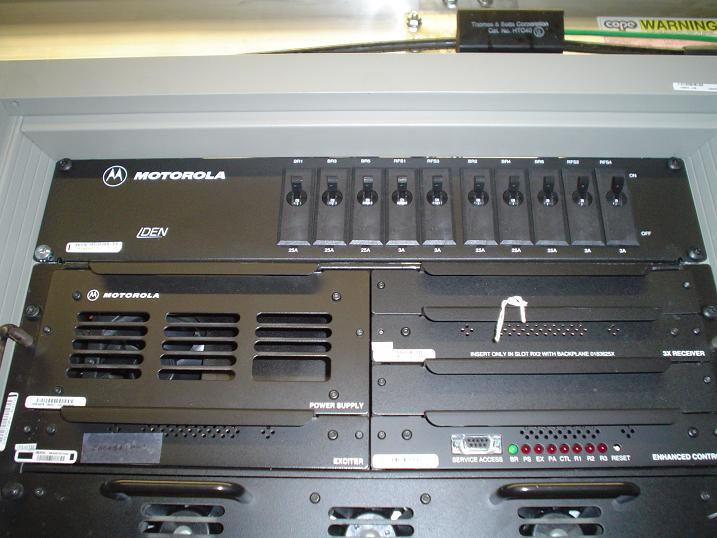
A professional rack-mount iDEN Base Radio at a Cell Site.

Trunked systems have groups of base stations configured as repeaters. The center blocks with frequencies in this trunked block diagram each represent a base station.

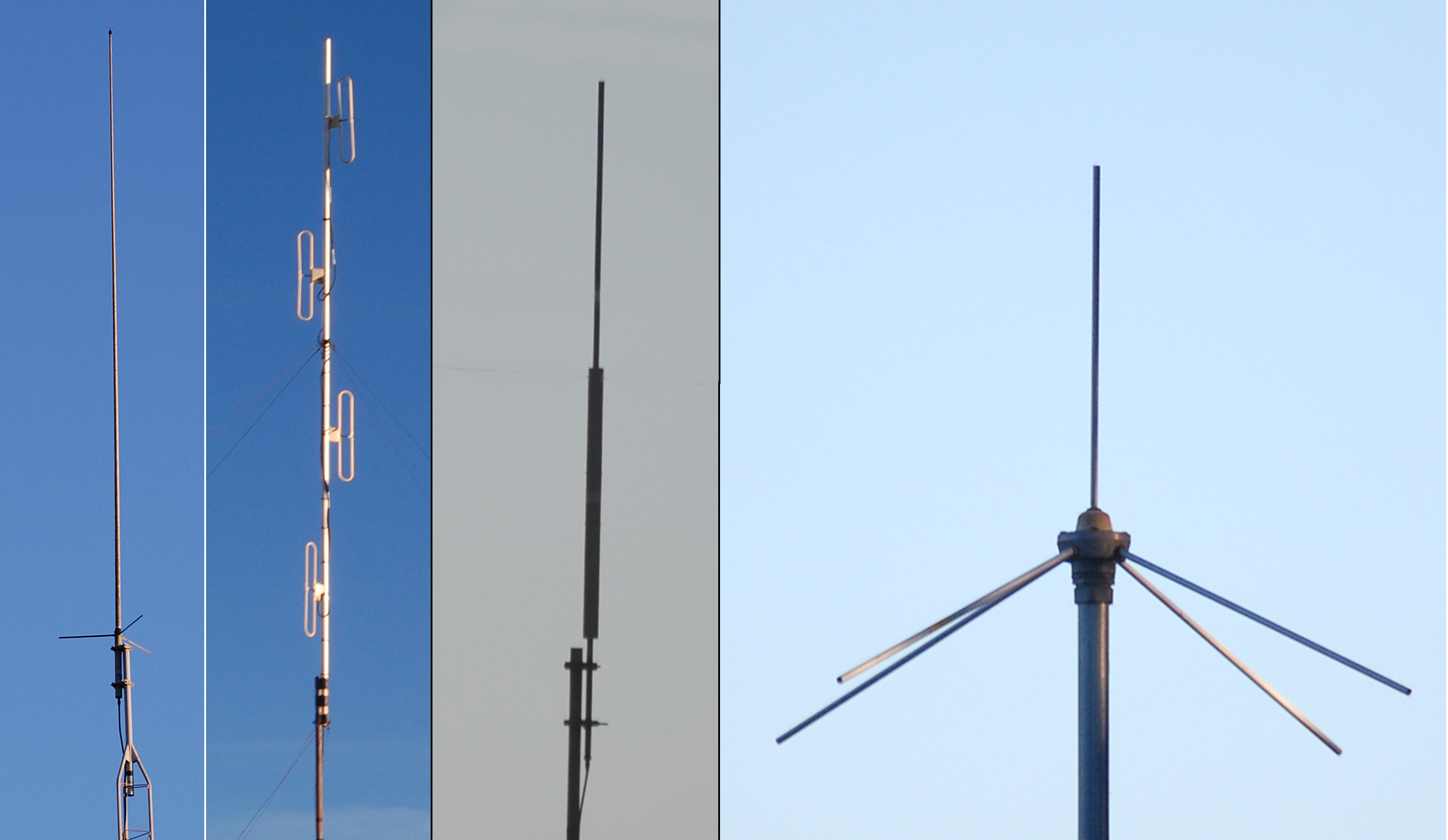
136–174 MHz US professional base station antenna examples.

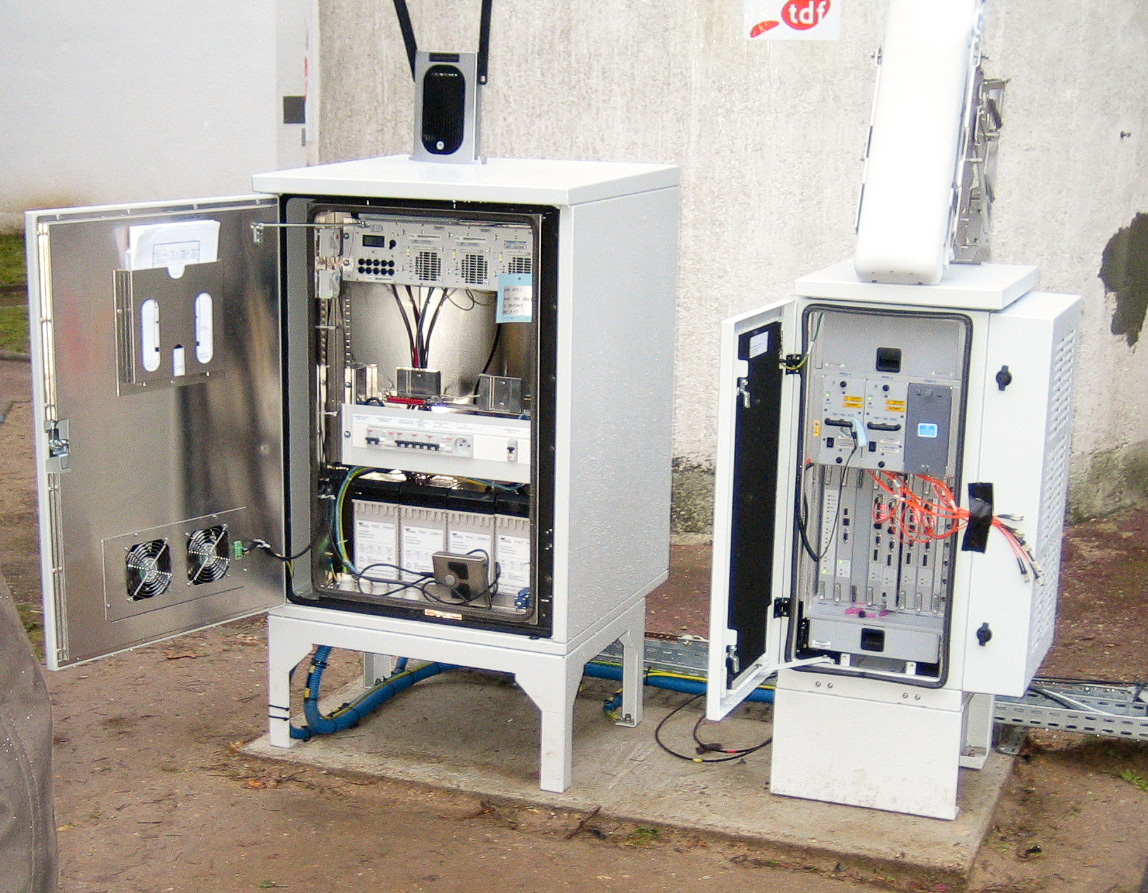
WiMAX base station equipment with a sector antenna and wireless modem on top

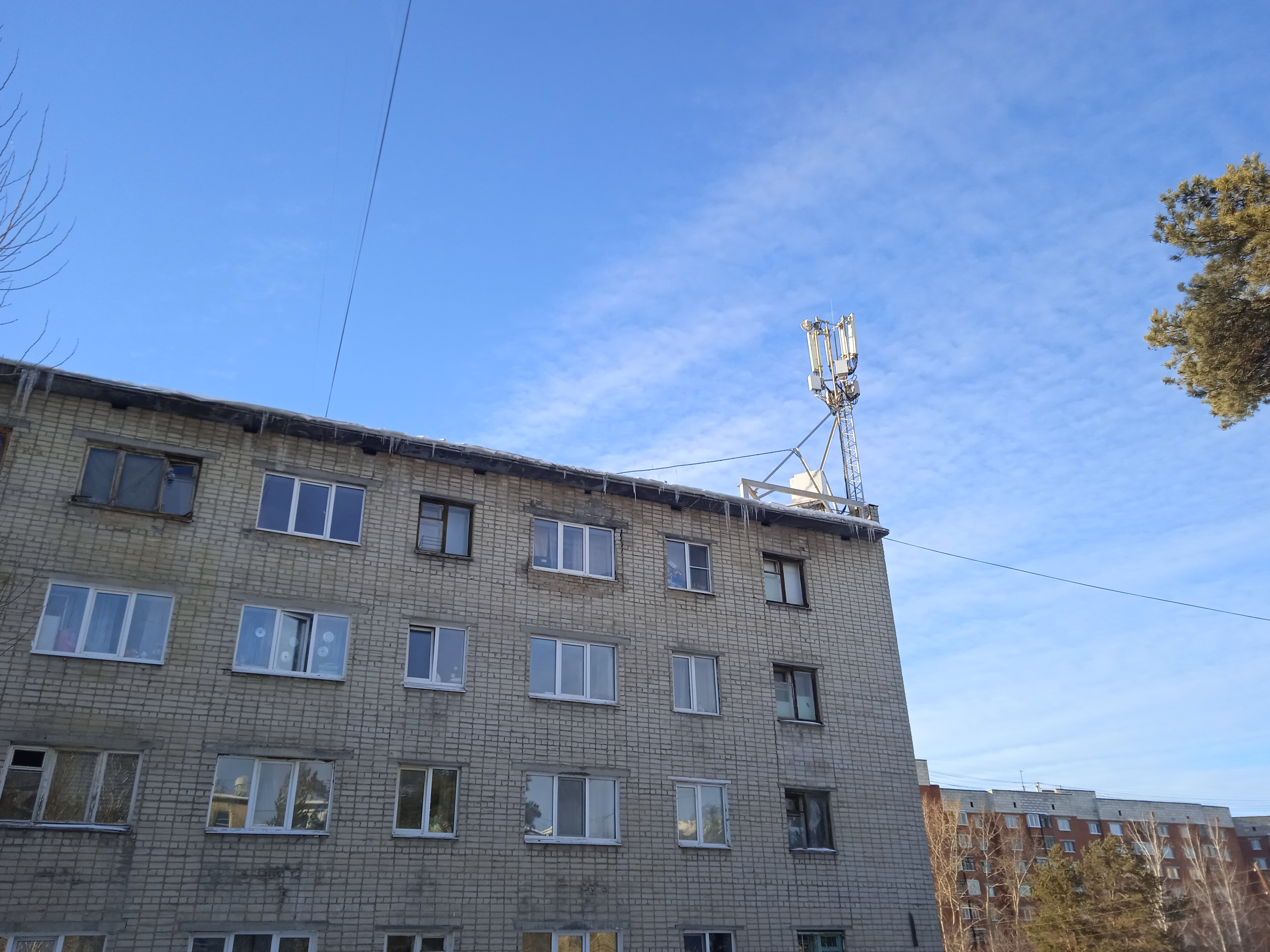
Cellular network base station in Yekaterinburg

== See also ==
- Base transceiver station
- Base station subsystem
- Mobile switching center
- Macrocell
- Microcell
- Picocell
- Femtocell
- Access point base station
- Cell site
- Cellular repeater
- Mobile phone
- Mobile phone radiation and health
- Portable phone
- Signal strength
- Audio level compression
- OpenBTS
