= Generic access =

Generic access may refer to:

- Generic Access Network
- Generic access profile
