= Virtual packet =

A virtual packet is a tool used to overcome the problem of trying to send data between two heterogeneous networks. If a router connecting networks A and B receives a frame constructed from network A, using protocol P_{A} as its data exchange protocol, it won't mean ANYTHING for addressing use on network B, which we will assume uses P_{B} as its data exchange protocol. To fix this, hardware-independent packet formats (or virtual packets) were created to overcome the heterogeneity.

Virtual packets include packets at any layer or sublayer (as those terms are used in, for example, the OSI model) above the most basic packets or frames used in a network. These "virtual packets" allow heterogeneous networks to talk to each other using a common protocol.
