= Audio headset =

Telephone or computer accessory

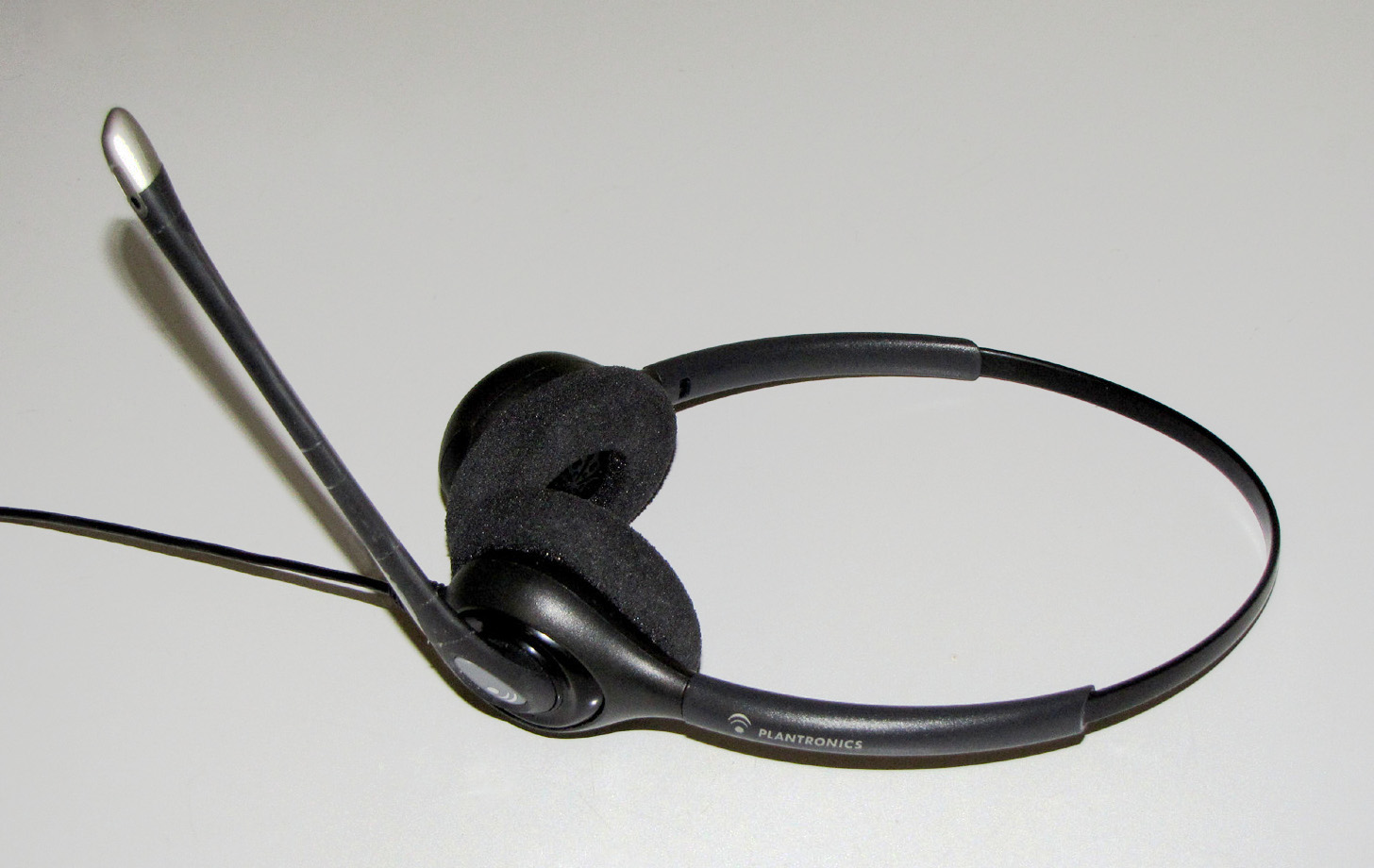
A typical call center/office headset

A headset is a combination of headphone and microphone. Headsets connect over a telephone or to a computer, allowing the user to speak and listen while keeping both hands free. They are commonly used in customer service and technical support centers, where employees can converse with customers while typing information into a computer. They are also common among computer gamers and let them talk with each other and hear others while using their keyboards and mice to play the game.

== Types ==
Telephone headsets generally use loudspeakers with a narrower frequency range than those also used for entertainment. Stereo computer headsets, on the other hand, use 32-ohm speakers with a broader frequency range.

=== Mono and stereo ===
Headsets are available in single-earpiece and double-earpiece designs. Double-earpiece headsets may support stereo sound or use the same monaural audio channel for both ears. Single-earpiece headsets free up one ear, allowing better awareness of surroundings. Telephone headsets are monaural, even for double-earpiece designs, because telephone offers only single-channel input and output.

=== Microphone style ===
The microphone arm of headsets may carry an external microphone or be of the voice tube type. External microphone designs have the microphone housed in the front end of the microphone arm. Voice tube designs are also called internal microphone designs and have the microphone housed near the earpiece, with a tube carrying sound to the microphone.

Most external microphone designs are of either omnidirectional or noise-canceling type. Noise-canceling microphone headsets use a bi-directional microphone as an element. A bi-directional microphone's receptive field has two angles only. Its receptive field is limited to only the front and the direct opposite back of the microphone. This creates an 8-shaped field, and this design is the best method for picking up sound only from close to the user, while not picking up most surrounding noises.

Omni-directional microphones pick up the complete 360-degree field, which may include much extraneous noise.

=== Headband styles ===
Standard headsets with a headband worn over the head are known as over-the-head headsets. Headsets with headbands going over the back of the user's neck are known as backwear-headsets or behind-the-neck headsets. Headsets worn over the ear with a soft ear-hook are known as over-the-ear headsets or earloop headsets. Convertible headsets are designed so that users can change the wearing method by reassembling various parts. There are also under-the-chin headsets similar to the headphones that stenographers wear.

=== Neckband styles ===
Neckband headsets (also called neckband earphones or neckband ear sets) have grown in popularity. These are a modern design where the band rests around the neck rather than over the head or directly on the ear. This design improves comfort during prolonged use keeps weight off the ears, and allows the band to house larger batteries, vibration motors and in-line controls. Neckband headsets are widely used in Bluetooth wireless models, offering a balance between portability and battery life.

=== Earpiece styles ===
Headset earpieces may be for either one or both ears. They generally come in one of 3 styles:

- in-the-ear -- these have a small speaker contained in an earbud that fits inside the outer portion of the ear canal.
- on-the-ear -- these have a flat speaker (often cushioned) that sits on the external ear.
- around-the-ear -- these have a larger, cushioned earpad that fits around the external ear and sits against the head, to exclude more external noise.

=== Telephone ===
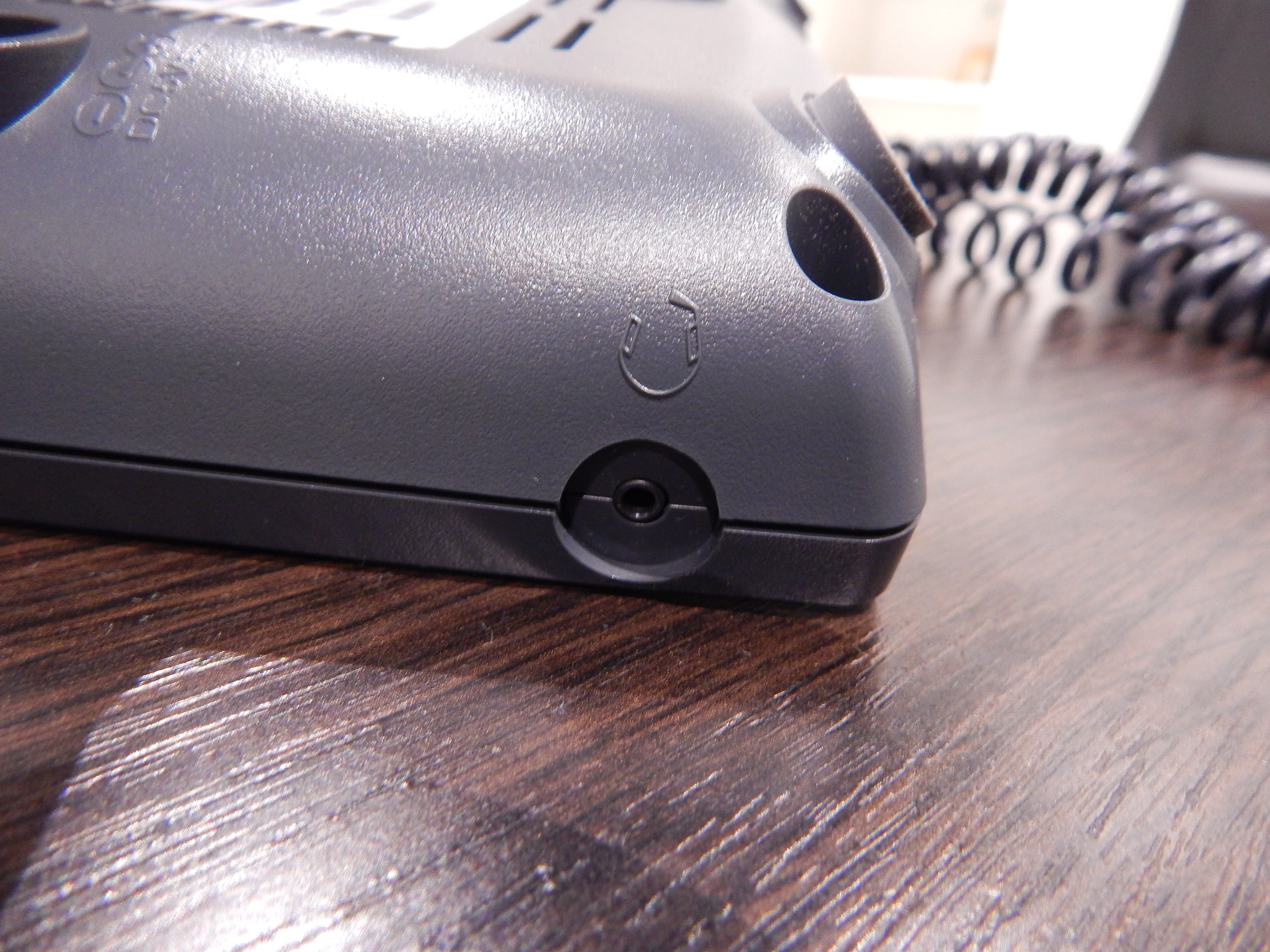
2.5mm jack

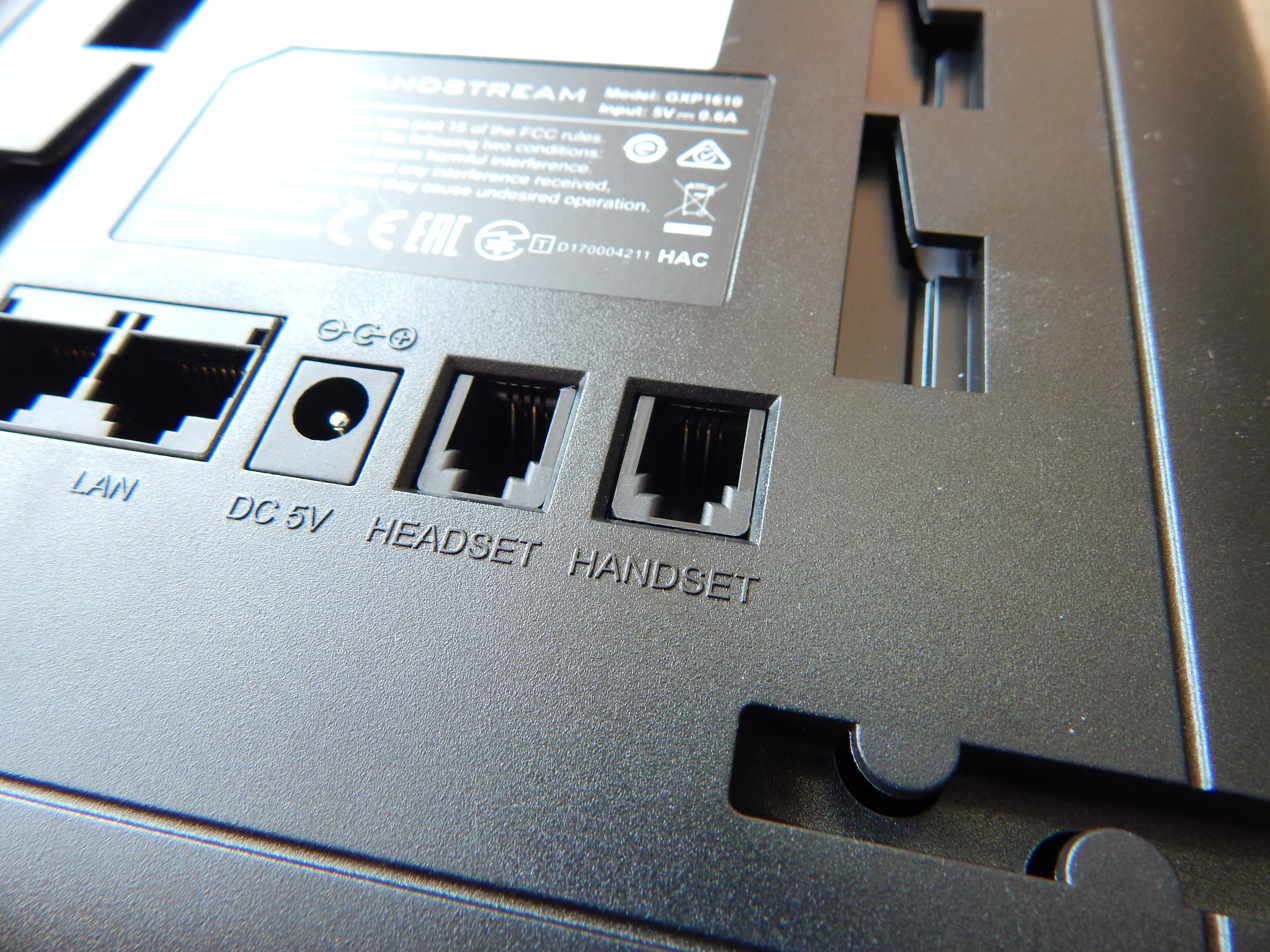
RJ-9 connector

Telephone headsets connect to a fixed-line telephone system. A telephone headset functions by replacing the handset of a telephone. Headsets for standard corded telephones are fitted with a standard 4P4C commonly called an RJ-9 connector. Headsets are also available with 2.5mm jack sockets for many DECT phones and other applications. Cordless bluetooth headsets are available and often used with mobile telephones. Headsets are widely used for telephone-intensive jobs, in particular by call centre workers. They are also used by anyone wishing to hold telephone conversations with both hands free.

Headset compatibility and pin alignment

Not all telephone headsets are compatible with all telephone models. Because headsets connect to the telephone via the standard handset jack, the pin alignment of the telephone handset may be different from the default pin alignment of the telephone headset. To ensure a headset can properly pair with a telephone, telephone adapters or pin-alignment adapters are available. Some of these adapters also provide a mute function and switching between handset and headset.

Telephone amplifiers

For older models of telephones, the headset microphone impedance is different from that of the original handset, requiring a telephone amplifier to impedance-match the telephone headset. A telephone amplifier provides basic pin alignment similar to a telephone headset adapter, but it also offers sound amplification for the microphone as well as the loudspeakers. Most models of telephone amplifiers offer volume control for the loudspeaker as well as the microphone, a mute function and switching between handset and headset. Telephone amplifiers are powered through batteries or AC adapters.

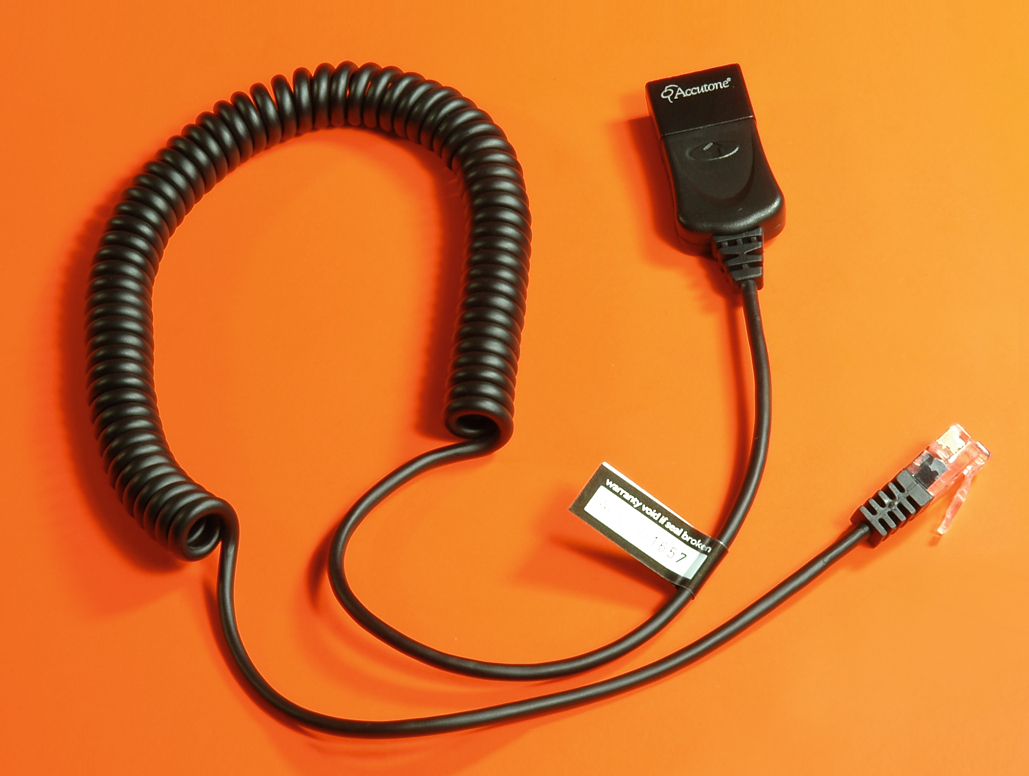
A typical Quick Disconnect bottom cable

Quick-disconnecting cable

Most telephone headsets have a Quick Disconnect (QD) cable, allowing fast and easy disconnection of the headset from the telephone without having to remove the headset.

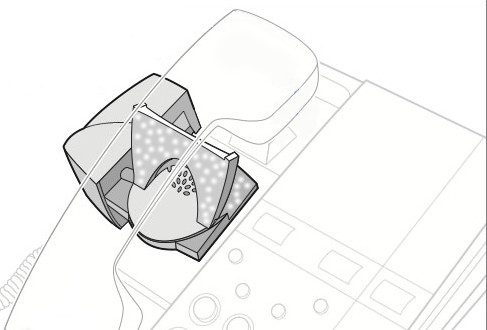
Standard handset lifter

Handset lifter

A Handset lifter is a device that automatically lifts or replaces a handset off/on a telephone. It is usually connected to a wireless headset and allows cordless headset use on technically primitive desk phones.

Some phones only have a mechanical means of switchhook operation. The lifter allows cordless headsets to be used remotely with such phones. The phone user presses the appropriate headset button to either answer a call or terminate a call. The headset's base station's interface with the handset lifter will take the appropriate action - lift or replace the handset.

The use of a handset lifter is considered archaic by most technical professionals. Technology from decades ago eliminated the need for such a device; however, many phones, including modern IP phones, still do not have discrete circuitry for switchhook operation.

== Computer ==
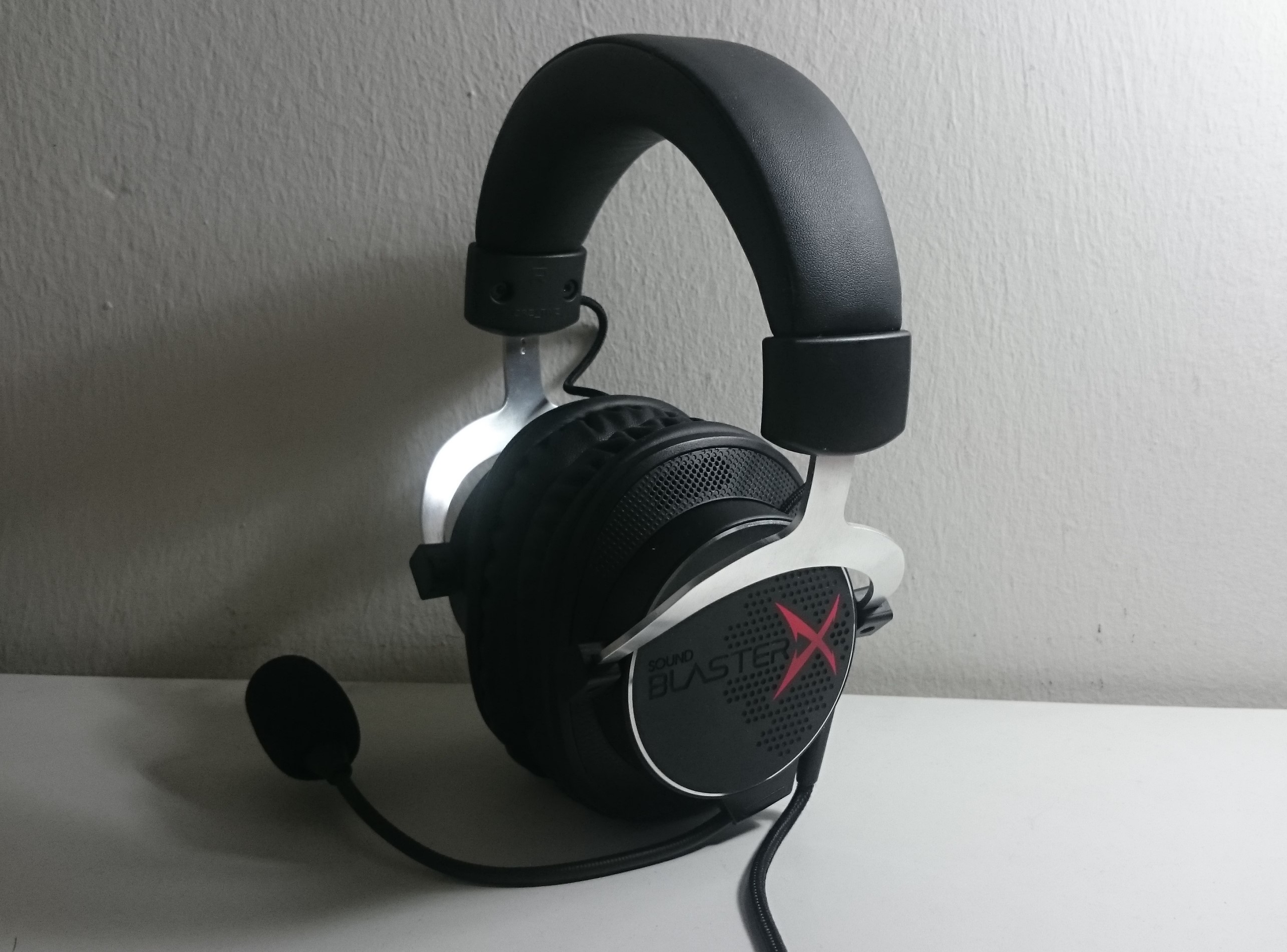
A typical gaming headset, with gaming-oriented graphics and a microphone attached. The microphone is on the left earcup. With standard 3.5 mm TRS connectors

Computer headsets generally come in two connection types: standard 3.5 mm and USB connection. General 3.5 mm computer headsets come with two 3.5 mm connectors: one connecting to the microphone jack and one connecting to the headphone/speaker jack of the computer. 3.5 mm computer headsets connect to the computer via a sound card, which converts the digital signal of the computer to an analog signal for the headset. USB computer headsets connect to the computer via a USB port, and the audio conversion occurs in the headset or in the control unit of the headset.

Gaming headsets for computers are specifically designed for gaming and provide some additional features that can be beneficial for gamers. These features include game-specific sound modes, aesthetic designs inspired by popular games or themes, detachable microphones, and RGB lighting.

== Mobile phone ==
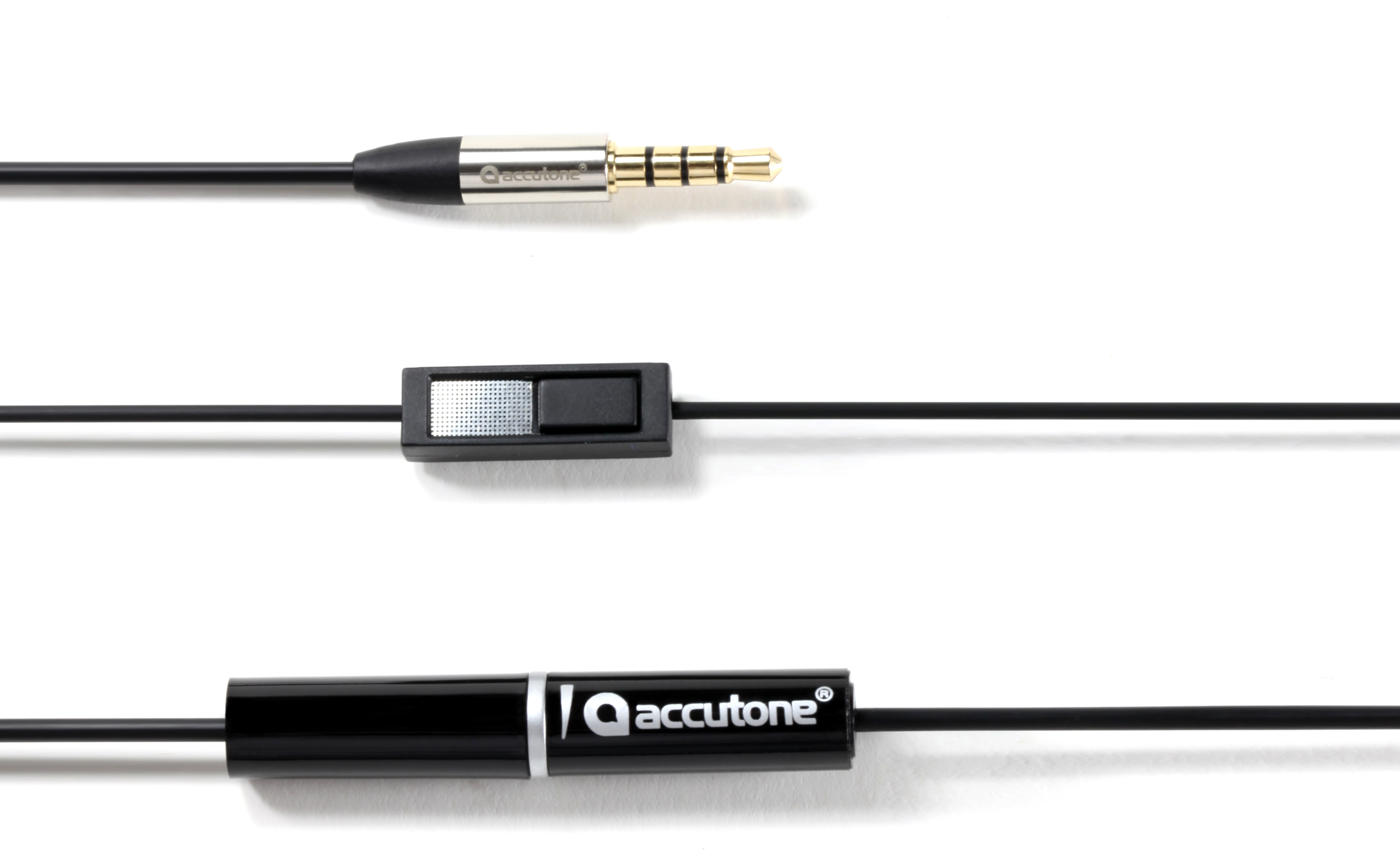
Mobile phone or smartphone headsets may include a volume control, microphone and 3.5mm plug.

Mobile (cellular) phone headsets are often referred to as handsfree. Older mobile phones used a single earphone with a microphone module connected in the cable. For music-playing mobile phones, manufacturers may bundle stereo earphones with a microphone. There are also third-party brands that may provide better sound quality or wireless connectivity.

Mobile headsets come in a range of wearing styles, including behind-the-neck, over-the-head, over-the-ear, and lightweight earbuds. Some aftermarket mobile headsets come with a standard 2.5 mm plug different from the phone's audio connector, so users have to purchase an adapter. A USB headset for a computer also cannot be directly plugged into a phone's or portable media player's micro-USB slot. Smartphones often use a standard 3.5 mm jack, so users may be able to directly connect the headset to it. There are, however, different pin alignments to the 3.5 mm plug, mainly OMTP and CTIA, so a user should find out which settings their device uses before buying a headphone/headset.

Many wireless mobile headsets use Bluetooth technology, supported by many phones and computers, sometimes by connecting a Bluetooth adapter to a USB port. Since version 1.1, Bluetooth devices can transmit voice calls and play several music and video formats, but audio will not be played in stereo unless the cell phone or media device and the headset both have the A2DP profile.

== Wireless ==
There are a number of wireless products, and they usually differ according to application and power management. The first wireless headsets were jointly invented by NASA and Plantronics during Apollo program to improve astronauts' communications during the mission.

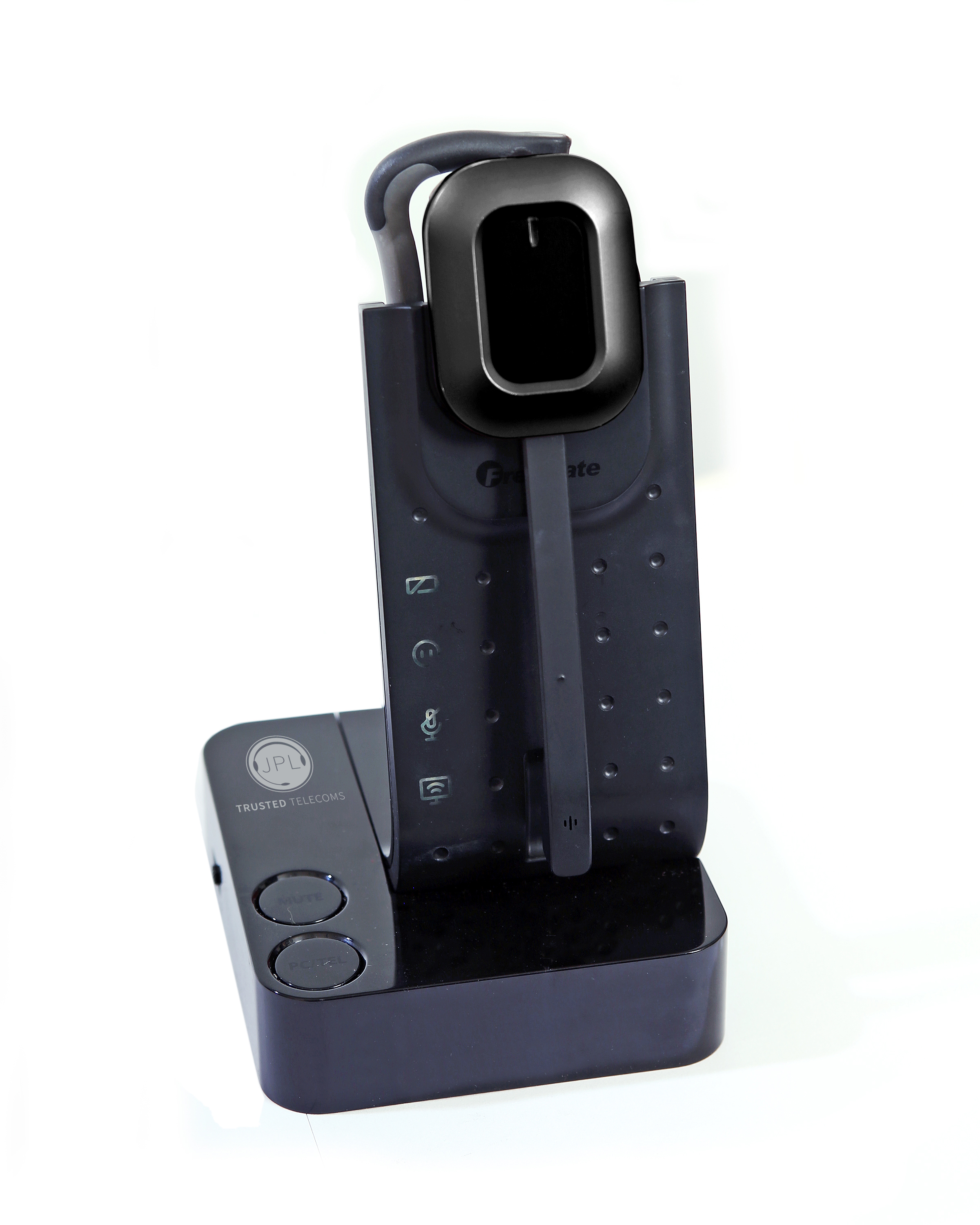
JPL Trusted Telecom X400 DECT

=== Digital Enhanced Cordless Telecommunications ===
Digital Enhanced Cordless Telecommunications (DECT) is one of the most common standards for cordless telephones. It uses 1.88 to 1.90 GHz RF (European Version) or 1.92 to 1.93 GHz RF (US Version). Different countries have regulations for the bandwidth used in DECT, but most have reserved this band for wireless audio transmission. The most common profile of DECT is Generic access profile (GAP), which is used to ensure common communication between the base station and its cordless handset. This common platform allows communication between the two devices even if they are from different manufacturers. For example, a Panasonic DECT base station theoretically can connect to a Siemens DECT Handset. Based on this profile, developers such as Plantronics, Jabra or Accutone have launched wireless headsets which can directly pair with any GAP-enabled DECT telephones. So, users with a DECT Wireless Headset can pair it with their home DECT phones and enjoy wireless communication.

=== 2.4 GHz ===
Because DECT specifications are different between countries, developers who use the same product across different countries have launched wireless headsets which use 2.4GHz RF as opposed to the 1.89 or 1.9 GHz in DECT. Almost all countries in the world have the 2.4 GHz band open for wireless communications, so headsets using this RF band is sellable in most markets. However, the 2.4 GHz frequency is also the base frequency for many wireless data transmissions; the bandwidth may be quite crowded, so using this technology may be more prone to interference.

Because 2.4 GHz Wireless Headsets cannot directly "talk" to any standard cordless telephones, an extra base unit is required for this product to function. Most 2.4 GHz Wireless Headsets come in two units, a wireless headset and a wireless base station, which connects to your original telephone unit via the handset jack. The wireless headset communicates with the base station via 2.4 GHz RF, and the voice signals are sent or received via the base unit to the telephone unit. Some products will also offer an automatic handset lifter, so the user can wirelessly lift the handset off the telephone by pressing the button on the wireless headset.

=== Bluetooth ===
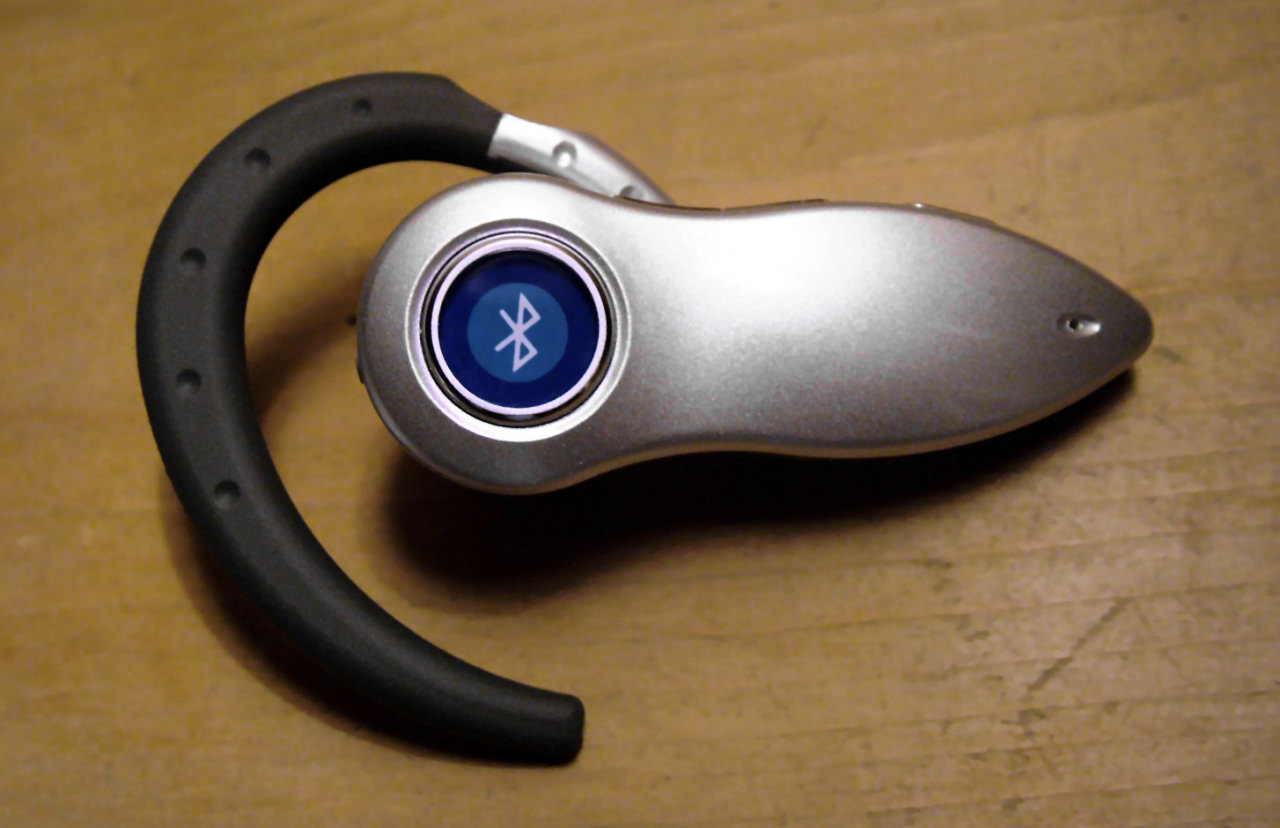
A typical late 2000's Bluetooth headset

Bluetooth technology is widely used for short-range voice transmission. While it can be and is used for data transmission, the short range (due to using low power to reduce battery drain) is a limiting factor. A very common application is a hands-free Bluetooth earpiece for a phone, which may be in a user's pocket. In July 2022 the Bluetooth SIG completed the Bluetooth LE Audio specifications, which give headsets and earbuds higher audio quality at lower power and add hearing aid support. LE Audio also added Auracast broadcast audio, which lets one source, such as a smartphone, stream to an unlimited number of earbuds, speakers or hearing aids.

There are two types of Bluetooth headsets. Headsets using Bluetooth v1.0 or v1.1 generally consist of a single monaural earpiece, which can only access Bluetooth's headset/handsfree profile. Depending on the phone's operating system, this type of headset will either play music at a very low quality (suitable for voice) or will be unable to play music at all.

Headsets with the A2DP profile can play stereo music with acceptable quality. Some A2DP-equipped headsets automatically deactivate the microphone function while playing music; if these headsets are paired to a computer via Bluetooth connection, the headset may disable either the stereo or the microphone function. Modern AirPods also have a microphone to use for calls and interactions with Siri digital assistant.

=== Bluetooth wireless desktop devices ===
Desktop devices using Bluetooth technology are available. With a base station that connects via cables to the fixed-line telephone and also the computer via sound card, users with any Bluetooth headset can pair their headset to the base station, enabling them to use the same headset for both fixed-line telephone and computer VoIP communication. This type of device, when used together with a multiple-point Bluetooth headset, enables a single Bluetooth headset to communicate with a computer and both mobile and landline telephones.

Some Bluetooth office headsets incorporate Class 1 Bluetooth into the base station so that, when used with a Class 1 Bluetooth headset, the user can communicate from a greater distance, typically around 100 feet, compared to the 33 feet of the more usual Class 2 Bluetooth headset. Many headsets supplied with these base stations connect to cellphones via Class 2 Bluetooth, however, restricting the range to about 33 feet.

=== Bone conduction headsets ===
Bone conduction headphones/sets transmit sound to the inner ear primarily through the bones of the skull, allowing the hearer to perceive audio content without blocking the ear canal. Bone conduction transmission occurs constantly as sound waves vibrate bone, specifically the bones in the skull, although it is hard for the average individual to distinguish sound being conveyed through the bone as opposed to the sound being conveyed through the air via the ear canal. Intentional transmission of sound through bone can be used with individuals with normal hearing — as with bone-conduction headphones — or as a treatment option for certain types of hearing impairment. Bone generally conveys lower-frequency sounds better than higher-frequency sounds. These headsets/phones can be wired or wireless.

== See also ==
- Safe listening
