= GSM Interworking Profile =

DECT profile

The GSM Interworking Profile, usually abbreviated to GIP and sometimes to IWP, is a profile for DECT that allows a DECT base station to form part of a GSM network, given suitable handsets. While proposed and tested, notably in Switzerland in 1995, the system has never been commercially deployed. Infrastructure issues make it less practical and useful to implement than the more recent GAN/UMA system, which can make use of usually unmetered and neutral Internet service to provide the connection back to the network operator.

== Description ==
Like the later GAN/UMA standard, GIP makes use of a technology that doesn't require licensed spectrum to expand capacity and allow end users, in theory, to improve coverage in areas difficult to reach via large, external, cell towers.

GIP is a DECT profile, meaning a set of protocols that runs over the base DECT system. The most popular profile for DECT is GAP, which is used to provide cordless phone service, but this is not used for GIP.

In GIP, several of the GSM lower level protocols are replaced by DECT-friendly equivalents. Voice channels make use of 32 kbit/s ADPCM channels rather than 13 kbit/s FR/EFR/AMR channels, for example.

The system supports handoff, and authentication is done via the GSM SIM card as normal. However, DECT terminals need to authenticate themselves against the base station, and this added layer is implementation dependent.

The base station is usually connected back to the GSM network via an ISDN line. An "A interface" is implemented over the ISDN line just as it would be for a BSC. This allows multiple GSM calls and GSM control data to be multiplexed over the 64 kbit/s ISDN B channels.

== Deployments ==
While GIP was deployed to some success at Telecom '95 in Geneva, the system has not been commercially deployed since. Hybrid DECT/GSM devices have appeared, but these have essentially been "Two phones in a box" systems that combine the functionality of a standard GAP phone with a GSM phone, so that a person can receive and make calls on either their home phone line or a mobile network without having to use two phones. An example of this approach is BT's/Ericsson's OnePhone service.

Most probably, the fact that the system requires an ISDN connection, which in most countries where ISDN is popular is priced by time used, has made GIP a difficult sell. In practice, the system appears to be oriented towards carriers instead of individuals, and carriers can more easily create microcells using their own spectrum, running ordinary GSM and not requiring the use of special handsets.

With the advent of the Internet and widespread availability of high speed Internet connections, GIP could be redesigned to make use of Internet instead of ISDN connections. However, the industry has gone in the direction of using GAN/UMA, which substitutes an 802.11 or Bluetooth air interface for GSM/UMTS's and as such can use unmodified commodity infrastructure.

== See also ==
- GAN/UMA
- GSM
- DECT
- GAP
- Microcell
- Picocell
