= Accutone =

Chinese manufacturer of headsets

Coordinates: 22.310237°N 114.224328°E

Accutone Technologies Limited
- Type: Private Company
- Industry: Consumer Electronics
- Founded: 1995; 31 years ago
- Headquarters: Hong Kong, China
- Area served: Worldwide
- Products: Headsets, audio headphone, telecommunications equipment, bluetooth headsets
- Website: www.accutone.com

Accutone Technologies is Hong Kong manufacturer and market leader of USB and wireless headsets for business and call centers, and premium-grade consumer audio headphones for smartphones and music-playing devices. Initially founded in the United Kingdom, the company later moved to Hong Kong and has operations in Spain, Mexico and production sites in China.

By 2011, the company was recognised as being one of the big four business headset brands globally and had begun building a wide range of pro-grade audio headphones for consumers.

Accutone also builds Original design manufacturer (ODM) headsets for UK, South American and United States telecom companies.

== History ==
Its predecessor company, Wing Cheong, a Hong Kong–based company started out manufacturing loudspeakers in 1969. Giving the company a start in the field of electro-acoustics.

Accutone Technologies Limited was officially established as a private company in 1995, originally in the United Kingdom. It was later incorporated in Hong Kong on the 20 November 1998 with its registered office in Kowloon, Hong Kong.

Between 1995 and 2010 it focused on call‑center and telecom headsets. In 2011 it added the consumer audio headphone devices.

== Products ==
=== Headsets for Call Centers ===
The business unit of Accutone builds headsets for office and call centres, ranging from telephone connection to VoIP connection. They are one of the few brands to supply Unified Communication (UC) Headsets in the market, supporting Microsoft Lync platform. With the expected continual growth of demand for headset in the global contact center and office market, a research showed that Accutone is a key contributor amongst only a handful of brands.

=== Consumer Audio Headphones ===
At the retail level, the Accutone brand is associated with a wide series of audio headphones, ranging from in-ear to over-the-head size and bluetooth headphones. Features like bass-tuning ability, usage of beryllium speakers, magnetic detachable cable, audio nozzle kits and dual-wear methods set them apart from other brands. Accutone has partnership with American company Comply to supply all their pro-line products with premium memory foam tips to improve bass performance.

== Ergonomics ==
Along with other developers like Plantronics, work safety is one of the primary concerns promoted by Accutone. They have in the past been highly involved in educating office workers, in headset ergonomics.
