= Small cell =

Cellular network infrastructure

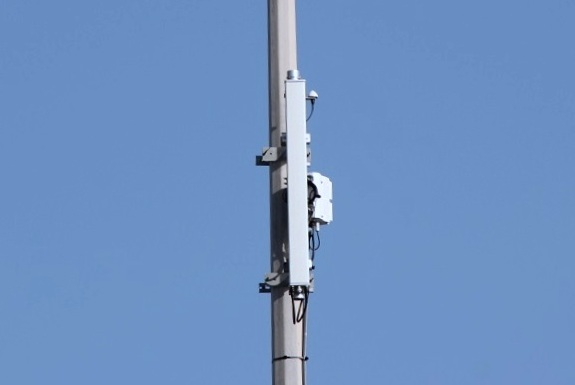
CableFree 5G Small Cell installed on a mast for a 5G-SA Private Network

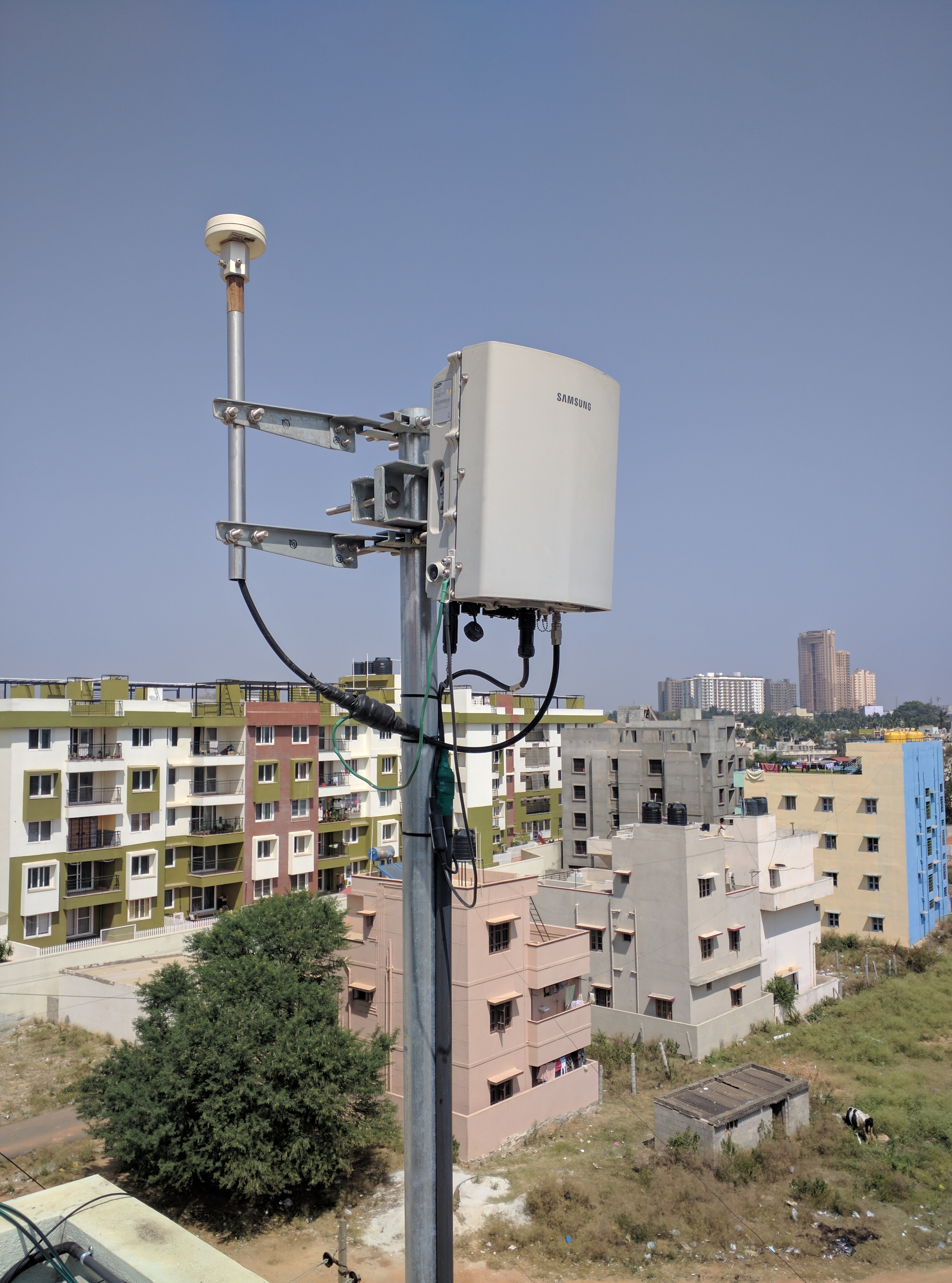
A small cell situated in the terrace of a building in Bangalore, Karnataka, India

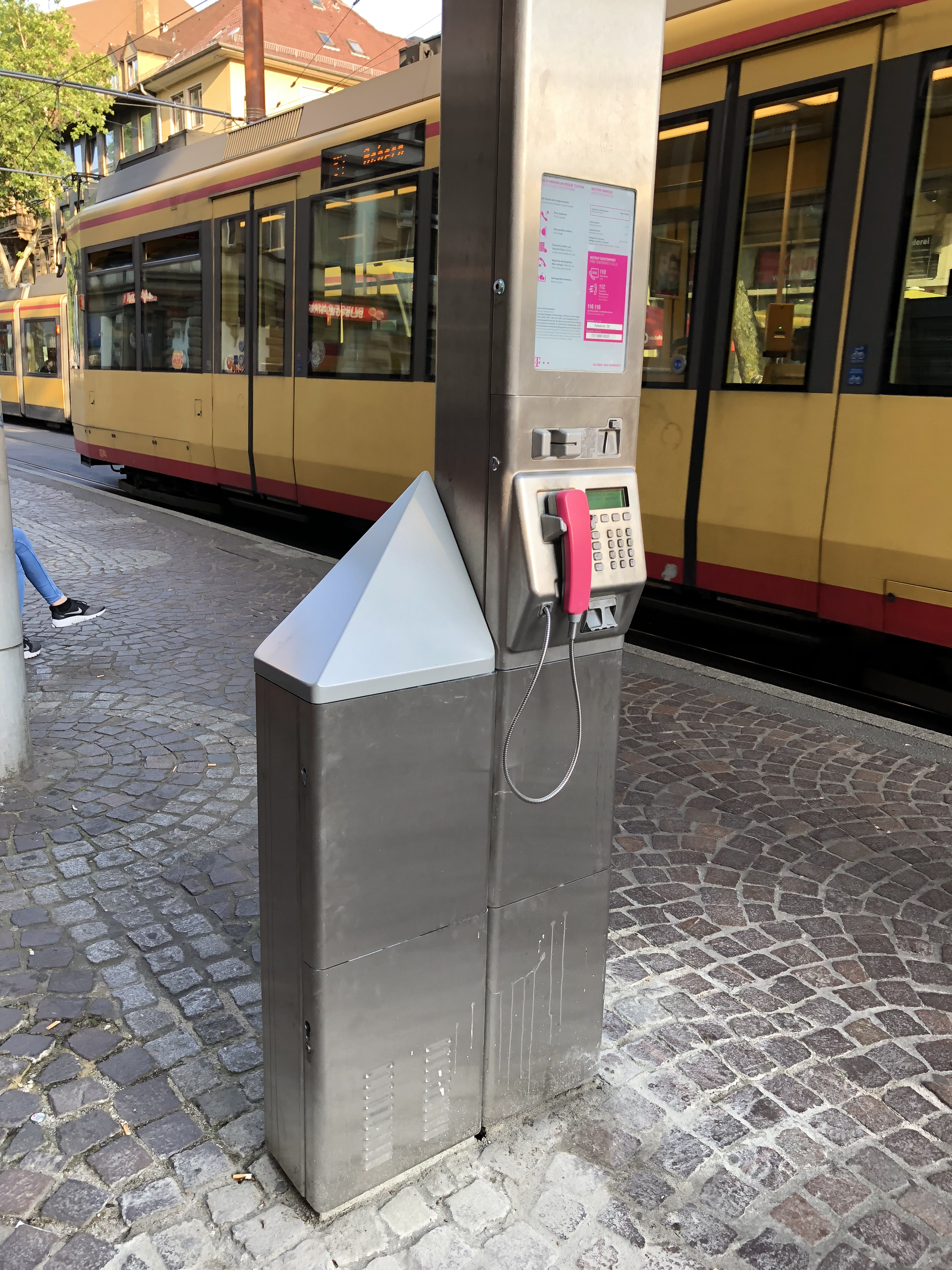
LTE small cell in Karlsruhe, Germany carrier Deutsche Telekom

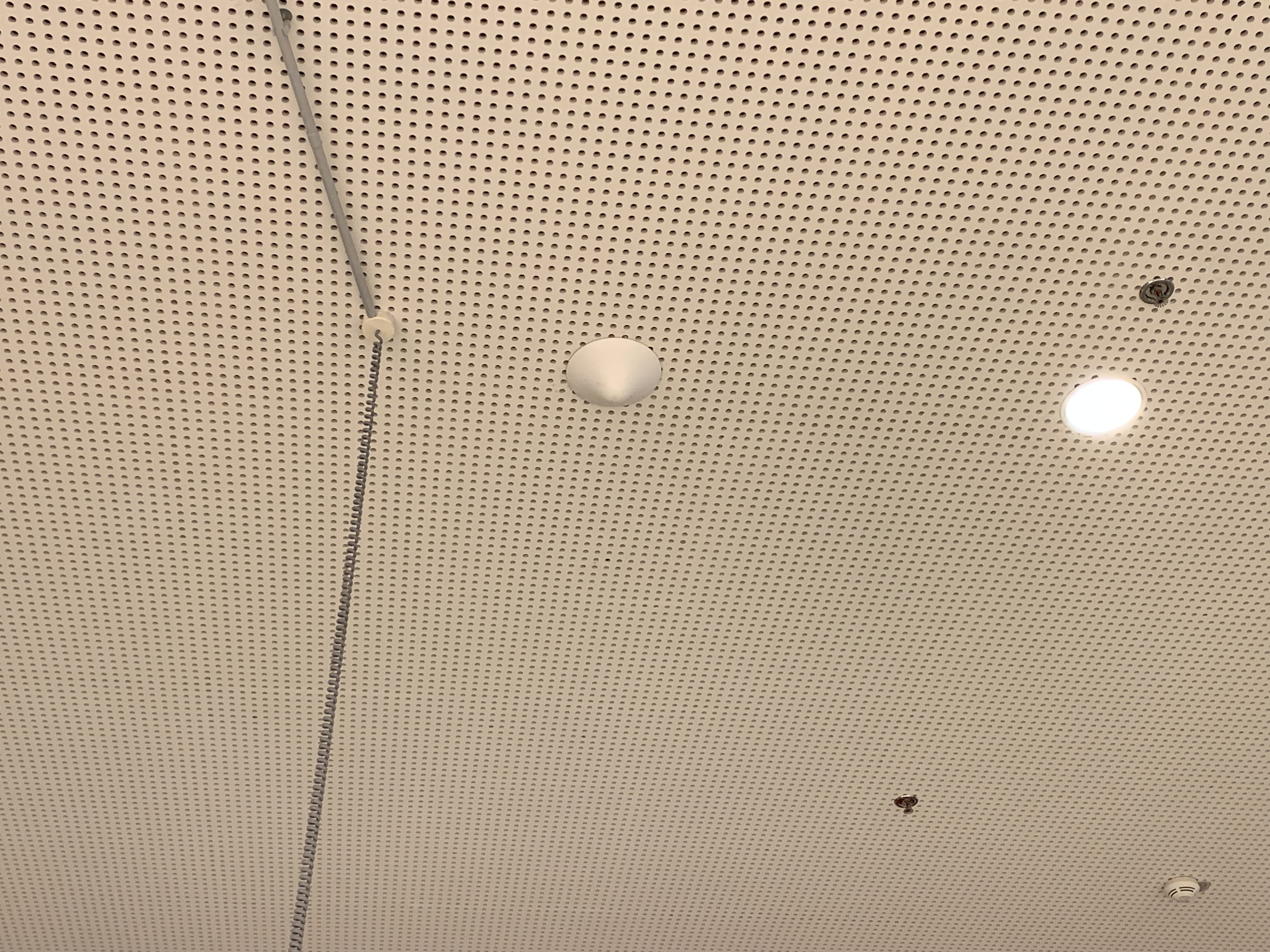
Small cell inside a shopping mall

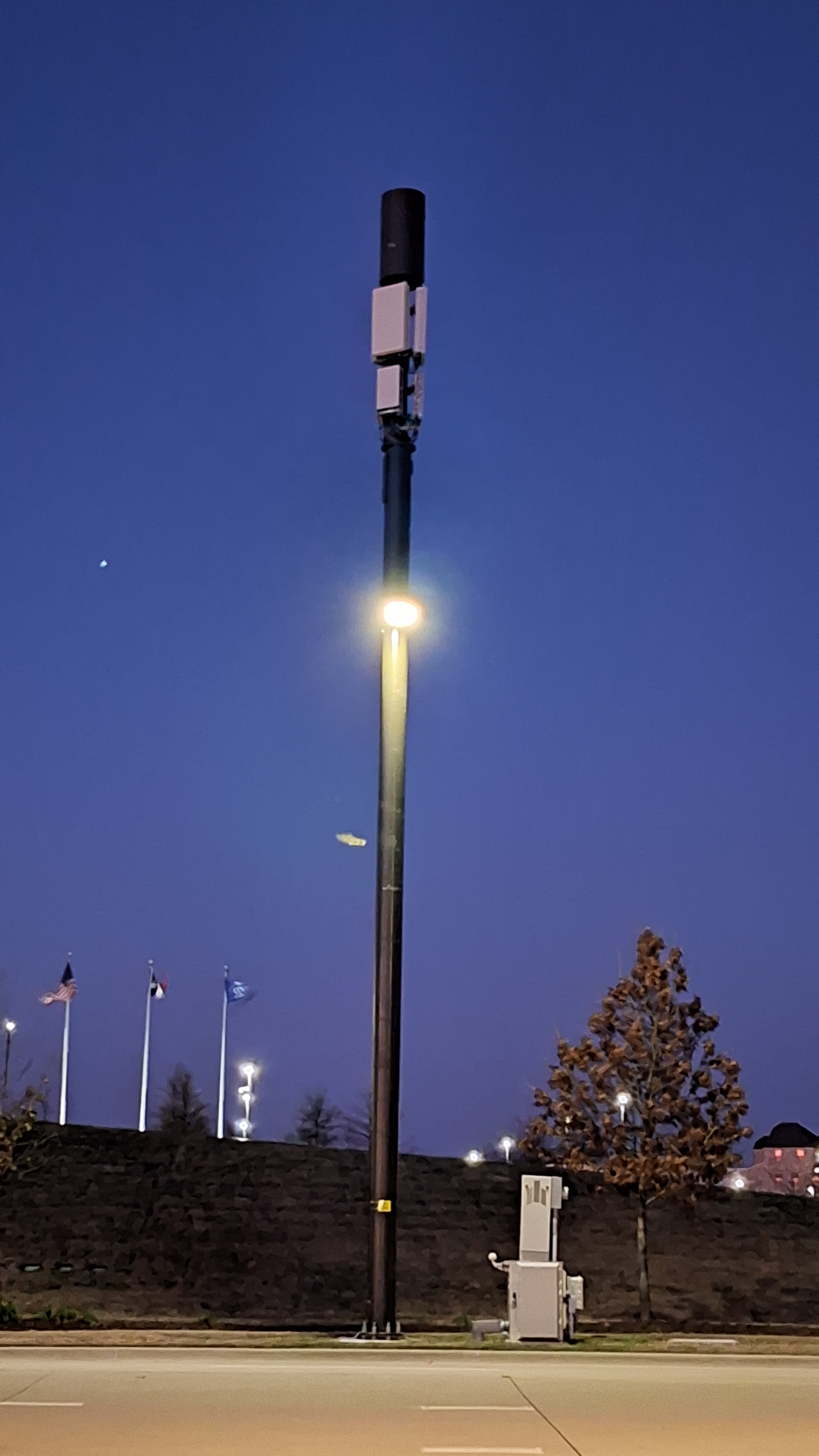
A small cell tower at Allen, Texas has light pool

Small cells are low-powered cellular radio access nodes that have ranges from around 10 meters to a few kilometers. They are base stations with low power consumption and cost. They can provide high data rates by being deployed densely to achieve high spatial spectrum efficiency.

In the United States, recent FCC orders have provided size and elevation guidelines to help more clearly define small cell equipment. They are "small" compared to a mobile macrocell, partly because they have a shorter range and partly because they typically handle fewer concurrent calls or sessions. As wireless carriers seek to 'densify' existing wireless networks to provide for the data capacity demands of 5G, small cells are currently viewed as a solution to allow re-using the same frequencies, and as an important method of increasing cellular network capacity, quality, and resilience with a growing focus using LTE Advanced.

== Types of small cells ==
Small cells may encompass femtocells, picocells, and microcells. Small-cell networks can also be realized by means of distributed radio technology using centralized baseband units and remote radio heads. Beamforming technology (focusing a radio signal on a very specific area) can further enhance or focus small cell coverage. These approaches to small cells all feature central management by mobile network operators.

Small cells provide a small radio footprint, which can range from 10 meters within urban and in-building locations to 2 km for a rural location. Picocells and microcells can also have a range of a few hundred meters to a few kilometers, but they differ from femtocells in that they do not always have self-organising and self-management capabilities.

Small cells are available for a wide range of air interfaces including GSM, CDMA2000, TD-SCDMA, W-CDMA, LTE and 5G. In 3GPP terminology, a Home Node B (HNB) is a 3G femtocell. A Home eNode B (HeNB) is an LTE femtocell. Wi-Fi is a small cell but does not operate in licensed spectrum and therefore cannot be managed as effectively as small cells utilising licensed spectrum. Small cell deployments vary according to the use case and radio technology employed.

== Umbrella term ==
The most common form of small cells are femtocells. They were initially designed for residential and small business use, with a short range and a limited number of channels. Femtocells with increased range and capacity spawned a proliferation of terms: metrocells, metro femtocells, public access femtocells, enterprise femtocells, super femtos, Class 3 femto, greater femtos and microcells. The term "small cells" is frequently used by analysts and the industry as an umbrella to describe the different implementations of femtocells, and to clear up any confusion that femtocells are limited to residential uses. Small cells are sometimes, incorrectly, also used to describe distributed-antenna systems (DAS) which are not low-powered access nodes.

== Purpose ==
Small cells can be used to provide in-building and outdoor wireless service. Mobile operators use them to extend their service coverage and/or increase network capacity.

ABI Research argues that small cells also help service providers discover new revenue opportunities through their location and presence information. If a registered user enters a femtozone, the network is notified of their location. The service provider, with the user's permission, could share this location information to update user's social media status, for instance. Opening up small-cell APIs to the wider mobile ecosystem could enable a long-tail effect.

Rural coverage is also a key market that has developed as mobile operators have started to install public access metrocells in remote and rural areas that either have only 2G coverage or no coverage at all. The cost advantages of small cells compared with macro cells make it economically feasible to provide coverage of much smaller communities – from a few ten to a few hundred. The Small Cell Forum have published a white paper outlining the technology and business case aspects. Mobile operators in both developing and developed countries are either trialing or installing such systems. The pioneer in providing rural coverage using small cells was SoftBank Mobile – the Japanese mobile operator – who have installed more than 3000 public access 3G small cells on post offices throughout rural Japan. In the UK, Vodafone's Rural Open Sure Signal program and EE's rural 3G/4G scheme increase geographic coverage.

== Future mobile networks ==
Small cells are an integral part of LTE networks. In 3G networks, small cells are viewed as an offload technique. In 4G networks, the principle of heterogeneous networks (HetNet) is introduced where the mobile network is constructed with layers of small and large cells. In LTE, all cells will be self-organizing, drawing upon the principles laid down in current Home NodeB (HNB), the 3GPP term for residential femtocells.

Future innovations in radio access design introduce the idea of an almost flat architecture where the difference between a small cell and a macrocell depends on how many cubes are stacked together.

The transmitting signal from Macro Base Station (MBS) weakens quickly once the MBS signal reaches indoors. Femtocells provide a solution to the difficulties present in macrocell-based system. Thus, Femto Base Station (FBS) network coverage is one of the prime concerns in indoor environment to get good quality of service (QoS).

== Market deployments to date ==
By December 2017 a total of over 12 million small cells have been deployed worldwide, with forecasts as high as 70 million by 2025.

== Small cell backhaul ==
Backhaul is needed to connect the small cells to the core network, internet and other services. For in-building use, existing broadband internet can be used. In urban outdoors, mobile operators consider this more challenging than macrocell backhaul because a) small cells are typically in hard-to-reach, near-street-level locations rather than in more open, above-rooftop locations and b) carrier grade connectivity must be provided at much lower cost per bit. Many different wireless and wired technologies have been proposed as solutions, and it is agreed that a toolbox of these will be needed to address a range of deployment scenarios. An industry consensus view of how the different solution characteristics match with requirements is published by the Small Cell Forum. The backhaul solution is influenced by a number of factors, including the operator's original motivation to deploy small cells, which could be for targeted capacity, indoor or outdoor coverage.

== See also ==
- Mesh networking
- Wireless ad hoc network
