= Land station =

Mobile radio station for stationary use

Land station (also: land radio station) is – according to Article 1.69 of the International Telecommunication Union´s (ITU) ITU Radio Regulations (RR) – defined as "A radio station in the mobile service not intended to be used while in motion."

Each station shall be classified by the service in which it operates permanently or temporarily.

See also

Selection of land stations

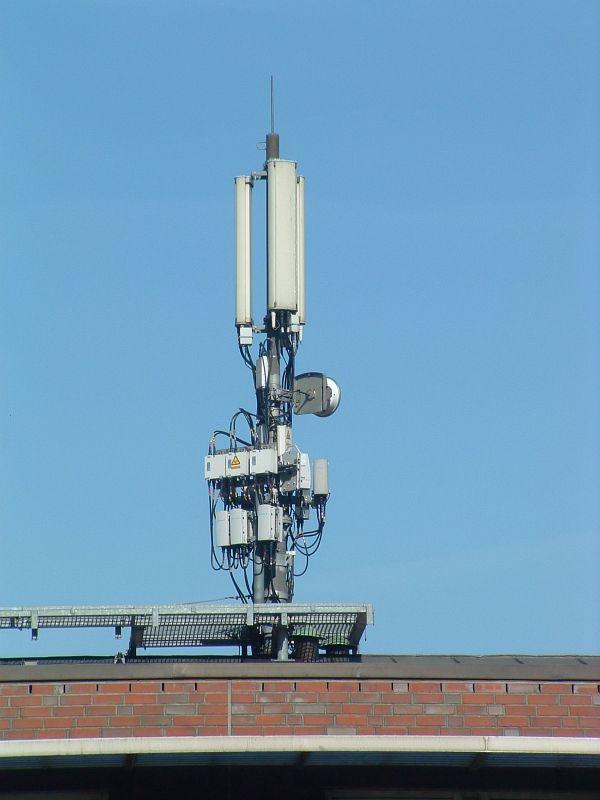
Land station, here: aerial of a BSM-base station (land mobile service)

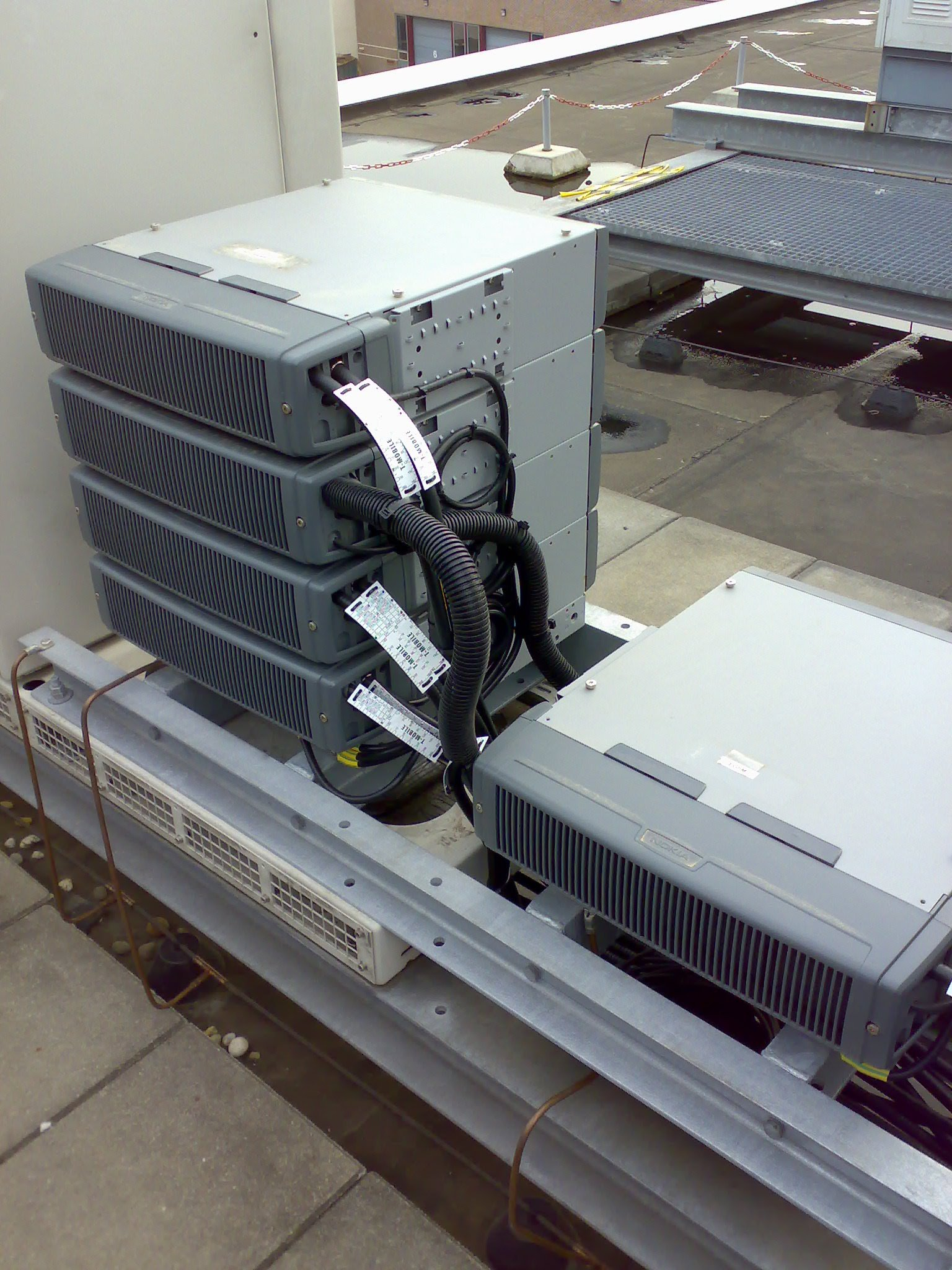
Land station, here: GSM transmitter / receiver (land mobile service)

== References / sources ==
- International Telecommunication Union (ITU)
