= Macrocell =

Cellular network infrastructure

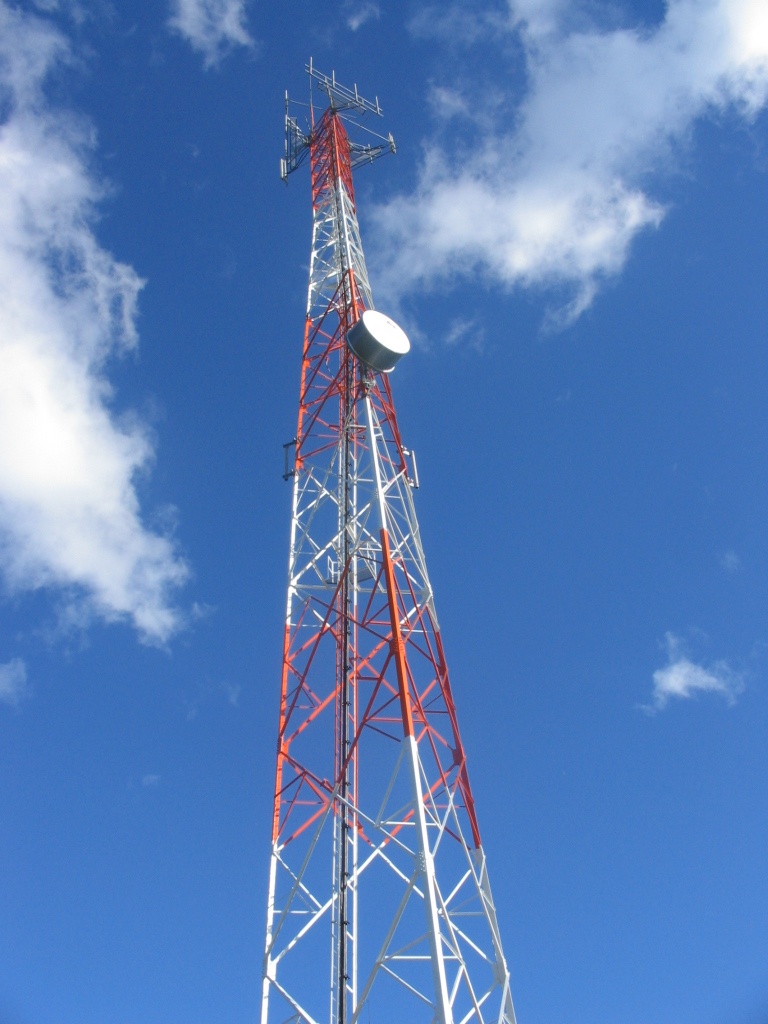
Cell phone tower

A macrocell or macrosite is a cell in a mobile phone network that provides radio coverage served by a high power cell site (tower, antenna or mast). Generally, macrocells provide coverage larger than microcell. The antennas for macrocells are mounted on ground-based masts, rooftops and other existing structures, at a height that provides a clear view over the surrounding buildings and terrain. Macrocell base stations have power outputs of typically tens of watts. Macrocell performance can be increased by increasing the efficiency of the transceiver.

== Scale ==
The term macrocell is used to describe the widest range of cell sizes. Macrocells are found in rural areas or along highways. Over a smaller cell area, a microcell is used in a densely populated urban area. Picocells are used for areas smaller than microcells, such as a large office, a mall, or train station. Currently the smallest area of coverage that can be implemented with a femtocell is a home or small office.

== See also ==
- Cellular network – Telecommunications networks transmitted by radio waves
- Femtocell – Small, low-power cellular base station
- Femtosatellite – Satellites of low mass and size, usually under 1200 kg
- GSM – Cellular telephone network standard since 1991
- Microcell – Cellular base station
- Picocell – Small cellular base station
- Small Cells – Cellular network infrastructure
