= Generic access profile =

The generic access profile (GAP) (ETSI standard EN 300 444) describes a set of mandatory requirements to allow any conforming DECT Fixed Part (base) to interoperate with any conforming DECT Portable Part (handset) to provide basic telephony services when attached to a 3.1 kHz telephone network (as defined by EN 300 176-2).

The objective of GAP is to ensure interoperation at the air interface (i.e., the radio connection) and at the level of procedures to establish, maintain and release telephone calls (Call Control). GAP also mandates procedures for registering Portable Parts to a Fixed Part (Mobility Management). A GAP-compliant handset from one manufacturer should work, at the basic level of making calls, with a GAP-compliant base from another manufacturer, although it may be unable to access advanced features of the base station such as phone book synchronization or remote operation of an answering machine. Most consumer-level DECT phones and base stations support the GAP profile, even those that do not publicize the feature, and thus can be used together. However some manufacturers lock their systems to prevent interoperability, or supply bases that cannot register new handsets.

The GAP does not describe how the Fixed Part is connected to the external telephone network.

== See also ==
- GSM Interworking Profile
