= Microcell =

Cellular base station

A microcell is a cell in a mobile phone network served by a low power cellular base station (tower), covering a limited area such as a mall, a hotel, or a transportation hub. A microcell is usually larger than a picocell, though the distinction is not always clear. A microcell uses power control to limit the radius of its coverage area.

Typically the range of a microcell is less than two kilometers wide, whereas standard base stations may have ranges of up to 35 kilometres (22 mi). A picocell, on the other hand, is 200 meters or less, and a femtocell is on the order of 10 meters, although AT&T calls its femtocell that has a range of 40 feet (12 m), a "microcell". AT&T uses "AT&T 3G MicroCell" as a trademark and not necessarily the "microcell" technology, however.

A microcellular network is a radio network composed of microcells.

== Rationale ==
Like picocells, microcells are usually used to add network capacity in areas with very dense phone usage, such as train stations. Microcells are often deployed temporarily during sporting events and other occasions in which extra capacity is known to be needed at a specific location in advance.

Cell size flexibility is a feature of 2G (and later) networks and is a significant part of how such networks have been able to improve capacity. Power controls implemented on digital networks make it easier to prevent interference from nearby cells using the same frequencies. By subdividing cells, and creating more cells to help serve high density areas, a cellular network operator can optimize the use of spectrum and ensure capacity can grow. By comparison, older analog systems have fixed limits, beyond which attempts to subdivide cells simply would result in an unacceptable level of interference.

== Microcell/picocell-only networks ==
Certain mobile phone systems, notably PHS and DECT, only provide microcellular (and Pico cellular) coverage. Microcellular systems are typically used to provide low cost mobile phone systems in high-density environments such as large cities. PHS is deployed throughout major cities in Japan as an alternative to ordinary cellular service. DECT is used by many businesses to deploy private license-free microcellular networks within large campuses where wireline phone service is less useful. DECT is also used as a private, non-networked, cordless phone system where its low power profile ensures that nearby DECT systems do not interfere with each other.

A forerunner of these types of network was the CT2 cordless phone system, which provided access to a looser network (without handover), again with base stations deployed in areas where large numbers of people might need to make calls. CT2's limitations ensured the concept never took off. CT2's successor, DECT, was provided with an interworking profile, GIP so that GSM networks could make use of it for microcellular access, but in practice the success of GSM within Europe, and the ability of GSM to support microcells without using alternative technologies, meant GIP was rarely used, and DECT's use in general was limited to non-GSM private networks, including use as cordless phone systems.

== See also ==
- Femtocell
- GSM
- Picocell
- Small Cells
