= Picocell =

Small cellular base station

A picocell is a small cellular base station typically covering a small area, such as in-building (offices, shopping malls, train stations, stock exchanges, etc.), or more recently in-aircraft. In cellular networks, picocells are typically used to extend coverage to indoor areas where outdoor signals do not reach well, or to add network capacity in areas with very dense phone usage, such as train stations or stadiums. Picocells provide coverage and capacity in areas difficult or expensive to reach using the more traditional macrocell approach.

== Overview ==
In cellular wireless networks, such as GSM, the picocell base station is typically a low-cost, small (typically the size of a ream of A4 paper), reasonably simple unit that connects to a base station controller (BSC). Multiple picocell 'heads' connect to each BSC: the BSC performs radio resource management and hand-over functions, and aggregates data to be passed to the mobile switching centre (MSC) or the gateway GPRS support node (GGSN).

Connectivity between the picocell heads and the BSC typically consists of in-building wiring. Although originally deployed systems (1990s) used plesiochronous digital hierarchy (PDH) links such as E1/T1 links, more recent systems use Ethernet cabling. Aircraft use satellite links.

More recent work has developed the concept towards a head unit containing not only a picocell, but also many of the functions of the BSC and some of the MSC. This form of picocell is sometimes called an access point base station or 'enterprise femtocell'. In this case, the unit contains all the capability required to connect directly to the Internet, without the need for the BSC/MSC infrastructure. This is a potentially more cost-effective approach.

Picocells offer many of the benefits of "small cells" (similar to femtocells) in that they improve data throughput for mobile users and increase capacity in the mobile network. In particular, the integration of picocells with macrocells through a heterogeneous network can be useful in seamless hand-offs and increased mobile data capacity.

Picocells are available for most cellular technologies including GSM, CDMA, UMTS and LTE from manufacturers including ip.access, ZTE, Huawei and Airwalk.

== Range ==
Typically the range of a microcell is less than two kilometers wide, a picocell is 200 meters or less, and a femtocell is on the order of 10 meters, although AT&T calls its product, with a range of 40 feet (12 m), a "microcell". AT&T uses "AT&T 3G MicroCell" as a trademark and not necessarily the "microcell" technology, however.

== See also ==
- Femtocell
- Macrocell
- Microcell
- Small cell
