= Radio spectrum =

Electromagnetic spectrum, 3 Hz – 3000 GHz

The radio spectrum is the part of the electromagnetic spectrum with frequencies from 3 Hz to 3,000 GHz (3 THz). Electromagnetic waves in this frequency range, called radio waves, are widely used in modern technology, particularly in telecommunication. To prevent interference between different users, the generation and transmission of radio waves is strictly regulated by national laws, coordinated by an international body, the International Telecommunication Union (ITU).

Different parts of the radio spectrum are allocated by the ITU for different radio transmission technologies and applications; some 40 radiocommunication services are defined in the ITU's Radio Regulations (RR). In some cases, parts of the radio spectrum are sold or licensed to operators of private radio transmission services (for example, cellular telephone operators or broadcast television stations). Ranges of allocated frequencies are often referred to by their provisioned use (for example, cellular spectrum or television spectrum). Because it is a fixed resource which is in demand by an increasing number of users, the radio spectrum has become increasingly congested in recent decades, and the need to utilize it more effectively is driving modern telecommunications innovations such as trunked radio systems, spread spectrum, ultra-wideband, frequency reuse, dynamic spectrum management, frequency pooling, and cognitive radio.

== Limits ==
The frequency boundaries of the radio spectrum are a matter of convention in physics and are somewhat arbitrary. Since radio waves are the lowest frequency category of electromagnetic waves, there is no lower limit to the frequency of radio waves. Radio waves are defined by the ITU as: "electromagnetic waves of frequencies arbitrarily lower than 3000 GHz, propagated in space without artificial guide". At the high frequency end the radio spectrum is bounded by the infrared band. The boundary between radio waves and infrared waves is defined at different frequencies in different scientific fields. The terahertz band, from 300 gigahertz to 3 terahertz, can be considered either as microwaves or infrared. It is the highest band categorized as radio waves by the International Telecommunication Union, but spectroscopic scientists consider these frequencies part of the far infrared and mid infrared bands.

Because it is a fixed resource, the practical limits and basic physical considerations of the radio spectrum, the frequencies which are useful for radio communication, are determined by technological limitations which are impossible to overcome. So although the radio spectrum is becoming increasingly congested, there is no possible way to add additional frequency bandwidth outside of that currently in use. The lowest frequencies used for radio communication are limited by the increasing size of transmitting antennas required. The size of antenna required to radiate radio power efficiently increases in proportion to wavelength or inversely with frequency. Below about 10 kHz (a wavelength of 30 km), elevated wire antennas kilometers in length are required, so very few radio systems use frequencies below this. A second limit is the decreasing bandwidth available at low frequencies, which limits the data rate that can be transmitted. Below about 30 kHz, audio modulation is impractical and only slow baud rate data communication is used. The lowest frequencies that have been used for radio communication are around 80 Hz, in ELF submarine communications systems built by a few nations' navies to communicate with their submerged submarines hundreds of meters underwater. These employ huge ground dipole antennas 20–60 km long excited by megawatts of transmitter power, and transmit data at an extremely slow rate of about 1 bit per minute (17 millibits per second, or about 5 minutes per character).

The highest frequencies useful for radio communication are limited by the absorption of microwave energy by the atmosphere. As frequency increases above 30 GHz (the beginning of the millimeter wave band), atmospheric gases absorb increasing amounts of power, so the power in a beam of radio waves decreases exponentially with distance from the transmitting antenna. At 30 GHz, useful communication is limited to about 1 km, but as frequency increases the range at which the waves can be received decreases. In the terahertz band above 300 GHz, the radio waves are attenuated to zero within a few meters due to the absorption of electromagnetic radiation by the atmosphere (mainly due to ozone, water vapor and carbon dioxide), which is so great that it is essentially opaque to electromagnetic emissions, until it becomes transparent again near the near-infrared and optical window frequency ranges.

== Bands ==
A radio band is a small frequency band (a contiguous section of the range of the radio spectrum) in which channels are usually used or set aside for the same purpose. To prevent interference and allow for efficient use of the radio spectrum, similar services are allocated in bands. For example, broadcasting, mobile radio, or navigation devices, will be allocated in non-overlapping ranges of frequencies.

=== Band plan ===
For each radio band, the ITU has a band plan (or frequency plan) which dictates how it is to be used and shared, to avoid interference and to set protocol for the compatibility of transmitters and receivers.

Each frequency plan defines the frequency range to be included, how channels are to be defined, and what will be carried on those channels. Typical definitions set forth in a frequency plan are:

- numbering scheme – which channel numbers or letters (if any) will be assigned
- center frequencies – how far apart the carrier wave for each channel will be (see channel spacing)
- bandwidth and/or deviation – how wide each channel will be
- spectral mask – how extraneous signals will be attenuated by frequency
- modulation – what type will be used or are permissible
- content – what types of information are allowed, such as audio or video, analog or digital
- licensing – what the procedure will be to obtain a broadcast license

=== ITU ===
The actual authorized frequency bands are defined by the ITU and the local regulating agencies like the US Federal Communications Commission (FCC) and voluntary best practices help avoid interference.

As a matter of convention, the ITU divides the radio spectrum into 12 bands, each beginning at a wavelength which is a power of ten (10^{n}) metres, with corresponding frequency of 3×10^{8-}^{n} hertz, and each covering a decade of frequency or wavelength. Each of these bands has a traditional name. For example, the term high frequency (HF) designates the wavelength range from 100 to 10 metres, corresponding to a frequency range of 3 to 30 MHz. This is just a symbol and is not related to allocation; the ITU further divides each band into subbands allocated to different services. Above 300 GHz, the absorption of electromagnetic radiation by Earth's atmosphere is so great that the atmosphere is effectively opaque, until it becomes transparent again in the near-infrared and optical window frequency ranges.

These ITU radio bands are defined in the ITU Radio Regulations. Article 2, provision No. 2.1 states that "the radio spectrum shall be subdivided into nine frequency bands, which shall be designated by progressive whole numbers in accordance with the following table".

The table originated with a recommendation of the fourth CCIR meeting, held in Bucharest in 1937, and was approved by the International Radio Conference held at Atlantic City, NJ in 1947. The idea to give each band a number, in which the number is the logarithm of the approximate geometric mean of the upper and lower band limits in Hz, originated with B. C. Fleming-Williams, who suggested it in a letter to the editor of Wireless Engineer in 1942. For example, the approximate geometric mean of band 7 is 10 MHz, or 10^{7} Hz.

The band name "tremendously low frequency" (TLF) has been used for frequency and wavelength of 1–3 Hz | 300,000–100,000 km (1000 Mm), but the term has not been defined by the ITU.

Band name	Abbreviation	ITU band number	Frequency and wavelength	Example uses
Extremely low frequency	ELF	1	3–30 Hz; 100,000–10,000 km (100 Mm)	Communication with submarines
Super low frequency	SLF	2	30–300 Hz; 10,000–1,000 km (10 Mm)	Communication with submarines
Ultra low frequency	ULF	3	300–3,000 Hz; 1,000–100 km (1 Mm)	Communication with submarines, communication within mines, landline telephony, fax machines, fiber-optic communication
Very low frequency	VLF	4	3–30 kHz; 100–10 km	Navigation, time signals, communication with submarines, landline telephony, wireless heart rate monitors, geophysics
Low frequency	LF	5	30–300 kHz; 10–1 km	Navigation, time signals, AM longwave broadcasting (Europe and parts of Asia), RFID, amateur radio.
Medium frequency	MF	6	300–3,000 kHz; 1,000–100 m	AM (medium wave) broadcasts, amateur radio, avalanche beacons, magnetic resonance imaging, positron emission tomography, electrical telegraph, wireless telegraphy, radioteletype, dial-up internet.
High frequency	HF	7	3–30 MHz; 100–10 m	Shortwave broadcasts, citizens band radio, amateur radio, over-the-horizon aviation communications, RFID, over-the-horizon radar, automatic link establishment (ALE) / near-vertical incidence skywave (NVIS) radio communications, marine and mobile radio telephony, CT scan, magnetic resonance imaging, positron emission tomography, cordless phones.
Very high frequency	VHF	8	30–300 MHz; 10–1 m	FM broadcasts, television broadcasts, cable television broadcasting, radars, line-of-sight ground-to-aircraft communications, aircraft-to-aircraft communications, emergency locator beacon homing signal, radioteletype, land mobile and maritime mobile communications, amateur radio, police, fire and emergency medical services broadcasts, weather radio, CT scan, magnetic resonance imaging, positron emission tomography, cordless phones.
Ultra high frequency	UHF	9	300–3,000 MHz; 100–10 cm	Television broadcasts, cable television broadcasting, microwave oven, radars, microwave devices/communications, radio astronomy, radars (L band), mobile phones, wireless LAN, Bluetooth, Zigbee, GPS and two-way radios such as land mobile, emergency locator beacon, FRS and GMRS radios, amateur radio, satellite radio, LoRa Networks (ISM band), police, fire and emergency medical services broadcasts, remote control systems, ADSB, cordless phones, internet, dial-up internet, satellite broadcasting, communication satellites, weather satellites, satellite phones (L band), satellite phones (S band).
Super high frequency	SHF	10	3–30 GHz; 10–1 cm	Radio astronomy, microwave devices/communications, wireless LAN, DSRC, most modern radars, communications satellites, cable and satellite television broadcasting, DBS, amateur radio, satellite broadcasting, communication satellites, weather satellites, satellite radio, cordless phones, internet, satellite phones (S band).
Extremely high frequency	EHF	11	30–300 GHz; 10–1 mm	Radio astronomy, satellite broadcasting, communication satellites, weather satellites, high-frequency microwave radio relay, microwave remote sensing, directed-energy weapon, millimeter wave scanner, Wireless Lan 802.11ad, internet.
Terahertz or tremendously high frequency	THF	12	300–3,000 GHz; 1–0.1 mm	Experimental medical imaging to replace X-rays, ultrafast molecular dynamics, condensed-matter physics, terahertz time-domain spectroscopy, terahertz computing/communications, remote sensing

=== IEEE radar bands ===
Frequency bands in the microwave range are designated by letters. This convention began around World War II with military designations for frequencies used in radar, which was the first application of microwaves. There are several incompatible naming systems for microwave bands, and even within a given system the exact frequency range designated by a letter may vary somewhat between different application areas. One widely used standard is the IEEE radar bands established by the US Institute of Electrical and Electronics Engineers.

Radar-frequency bands according to IEEE standard
Band designation	Frequency range	Explanation of meaning of letters
HF	0.003 to 0.03 GHz	High frequency (Note: Table 2 in)
VHF	0.03 to 0.3 GHz	Very high frequency
UHF	0.3 to 1 GHz	Ultra-high frequency
L	1 to 2 GHz	Long wave
S	2 to 4 GHz	Short wave
C	4 to 8 GHz	Compromise between S and X
X	8 to 12 GHz	Used in World War II for fire control, X for cross (as in crosshair). Exotic.
K_{u}	12 to 18 GHz	Kurz-under
K	18 to 27 GHz	German: Kurz (short)
K_{a}	27 to 40 GHz	Kurz-above
V	40 to 75 GHz	
W	75 to 110 GHz	W follows V in the alphabet
mm or G	110 to 300 GHz (Note: The designation mm is also used to refer to the range from 30 to 300 GHz.)	Millimeter

=== EU, NATO, US ECM frequency designations ===
NATO letter band designation				Broadcasting band designation
1978-Present nomenclature		Pre-1978 nomenclature		Broadcasting band designation
Band	Frequency (MHz)	Band	Frequency (MHz)	Broadcasting band designation
A	0 – 250	I	100 – 150	Band I 47 – 68 MHz (TV)
A	0 – 250	I	100 – 150	Band II; 87.5 – 108 MHz (FM)
A	0 – 250	G	150 – 225	Band III; 174 – 230 MHz (TV)
B	250 – 500	P	225 – 390	
C	500 – 1 000	L	390 – 1 550	Band IV; 470 – 582 MHz (TV)
C	500 – 1 000	L	390 – 1 550	Band V 582 – 862 MHz (TV)
D	1 000 – 2 000	S	1 550 – 3 900	
E	2 000 – 3 000	S	1 550 – 3 900	
F	3 000 – 4 000	S	1 550 – 3 900	
G	4 000 – 6 000	C	3 900 – 6 200	
H	6 000 – 8 000	X	6 200 – 10 900	
I	8 000 – 10 000	X	6 200 – 10 900	
J	10 000 – 20 000	Ku	10 900 – 20 000	Band VI; 11.7 – 12.5 GHz (DBS and radio astronomy)
K	20 000 – 40 000	Ka	20 000 – 36 000	
L	40 000 – 60 000	Q	36 000 – 46 000	
L	40 000 – 60 000	V	46 000 – 56 000	
M	60 000 – 100 000	W	56 000 – 100 000	
US Military/SACLANT				
N	100 000 – 200 000			
O	200 000 – 300 000			

=== Waveguide frequency bands ===
Band	Frequency range
R band	1.70 to 2.60 GHz
D band	2.20 to 3.30 GHz
S band	2.60 to 3.95 GHz
E band	3.30 to 4.90 GHz
G band	3.95 to 5.85 GHz
F band	4.90 to 7.05 GHz
C band	5.85 to 8.20 GHz
H band	7.05 to 10.10 GHz
X band	8.2 to 12.4 GHz
K_{u} band	12.4 to 18.0 GHz
K band	18.0 to 26.5 GHz
K_{a} band	26.5 to 40.0 GHz
Q band	33 to 50 GHz
U band	40 to 60 GHz
V band	50 to 75 GHz
E band	60 to 90 GHz
W band	75 to 110 GHz
F band	90 to 140 GHz
D band	110 to 170 GHz
Y band	325 to 500 GHz

=== Comparison of radio band designation standards ===
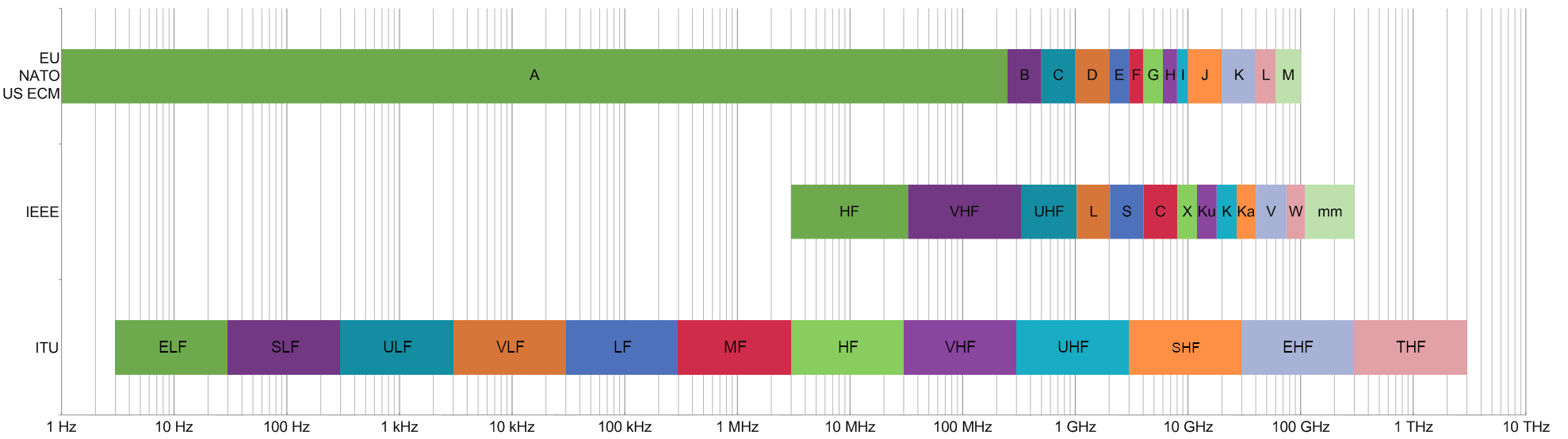
Comparison of frequency band designations

The frequency of 1–3 Hz has been called by the band name TLF but the term has not been defined by the ITU.

Frequency	IEEE	EU, NATO, US ECM	ITU	
Frequency	IEEE	EU, NATO, US ECM	no.	abbr.
		A		
3 Hz		A	1	ELF
30 Hz		A	2	SLF
300 Hz		A	3	ULF
3 kHz		A	4	VLF
30 kHz		A	5	LF
300 kHz		A	6	MF
3 MHz	HF	A	7	HF
30 MHz	VHF	A	8	VHF
250 MHz	VHF	B	8	VHF
300 MHz	UHF	B	9	UHF
500 MHz	UHF	C	9	UHF
1 GHz	L	D	9	UHF
2 GHz	S	E	9	UHF
3 GHz	S	F	10	SHF
4 GHz	C	G	10	SHF
6 GHz	C	H	10	SHF
8 GHz	X	I	10	SHF
10 GHz	X	J	10	SHF
12 GHz	K_{u}	J	10	SHF
18 GHz	K	J	10	SHF
20 GHz	K	K	10	SHF
27 GHz	K_{a}	K	10	SHF
30 GHz	K_{a}	K	11	EHF
40 GHz	V	L	11	EHF
60 GHz	V	M	11	EHF
75 GHz	W	M	11	EHF
100 GHz	W		11	EHF
110 GHz	mm		11	EHF
300 GHz			12	THF
3 THz				

== Applications ==
Radio has many practical applications, which include broadcasting, voice communication, data communication, radar, radiolocation, medical treatments, and remote control.

== See also ==
- AM broadcasting
- Amateur radio frequency allocations
- Broadcasting
- Cellular frequencies
- Copenhagen Frequency Plan of 1948
- DXing
- FM broadcast band
- Frequency allocation
- Geneva Frequency Plan of 1975
- Ham radio
- North American Regional Broadcasting Agreement
- Open spectrum
- Orbit spectrum
- Radio astronomy
- Radio broadcasting
- Radio communication
- Scanner (radio)
- Two-way radio
- U-NII
- Ultra-wideband
- WARC bands
