= Microwave antenna =

Physical transmission device

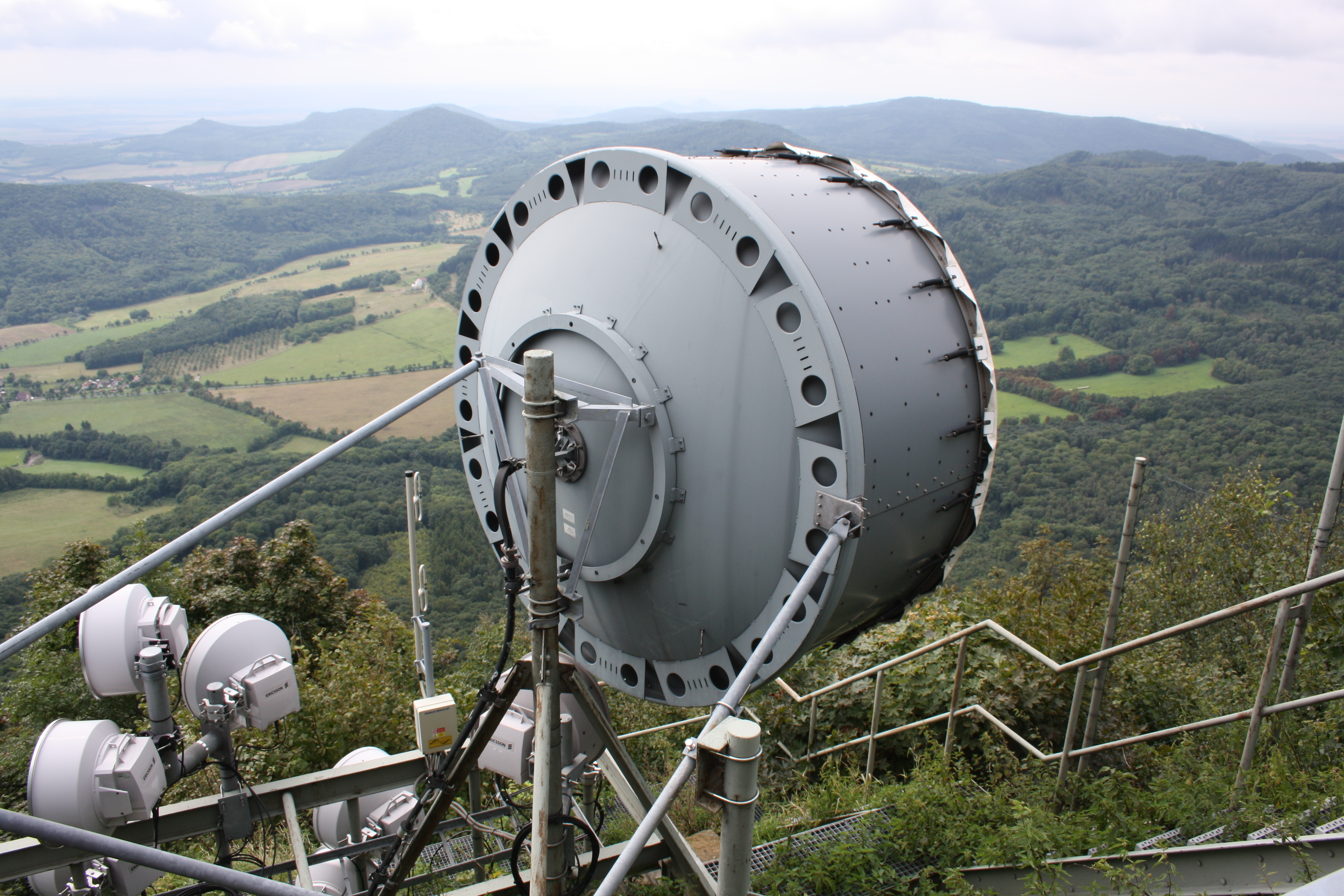
A typical larger microwave antenna designed for mid to long range

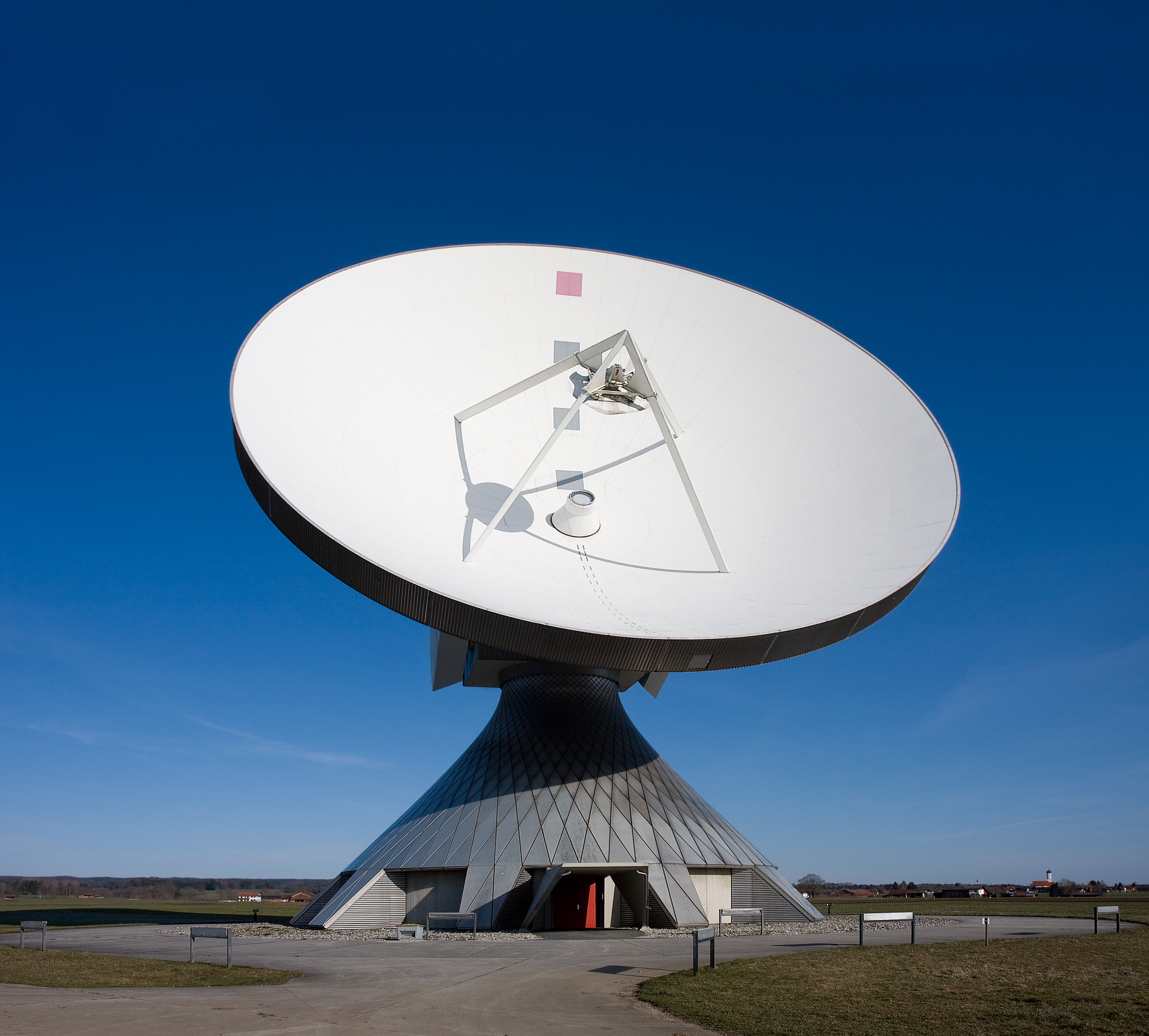
A parabolic satellite antenna for Erdfunkstelle Raisting, based in Raisting, Bavaria, Germany.

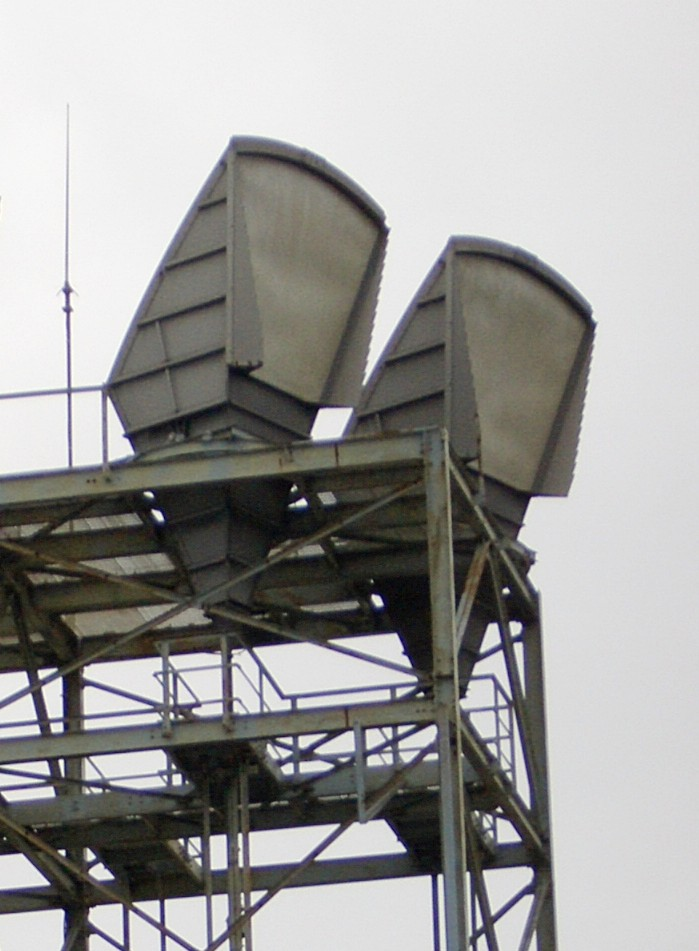
C band horn-reflector antennas on the roof of a telephone switching center in Seattle, Washington, part of the U.S. AT&T Long Lines microwave relay network.

A microwave antenna is a physical transmission device used to send and receive microwaves between two or more locations. In addition to broadcasting, antennas are also used in radar, radio astronomy and electronic warfare.

== Microwave frequency bands ==
Radio bands where microwave antennas are commonly deployed in 2016 FCC
C band	4 to 8 GHz	3.75 cm to 7.5 cm	4 GHz, 6 GHz
X band	8 to 12 GHz	25 mm to 37.5 mm	10 GHz, 11 GHz
K_{u} band	12 to 18 GHz	16.7 mm to 25 mm	12 GHz, 18 GHz
K band	18 to 26.5 GHz	11.3 mm to 16.7 mm	18 GHz
K_{a} band	26.5 to 40 GHz	5.0 mm to 11.3 mm	23 GHz, 31 GHz
Q band	33 to 50 GHz	6.0 mm to 9.0 mm	38 GHz
W band	75 to 110 GHz	2.7 mm to 4.0 mm	70 GHz, 80 GHz, 90 GHz

== Uses ==
- One-way (e.g. television broadcasting) and two-way telecommunication using communications satellites
- Terrestrial microwave relay links in telecommunications networks including backbone or backhaul carriers in cellular networks linking BTS-BSC and BSC-MSC.
- Radar
- Radio astronomy
- Communications intelligence
- Electronic warfare

== Antenna types ==
=== Reflector antennas ===
A parabolic antenna is an antenna that uses a parabolic reflector, a curved surface with the cross-sectional shape of a parabola, to direct the radio waves. These devices range anywhere from 6" to more than 12' diameter depending on application and use.

=== Horn antennas ===
A horn antenna or microwave horn is an antenna that consists of a flaring metal waveguide shaped like a horn to direct radio waves in a beam. Horns are widely used as antennas at UHF and microwave frequencies, above 300 MHz.

=== Lens antennas ===
A lens antenna uses a lens to direct or collect microwave radiation.

=== Array antennas ===
An array antenna is a high gain antenna consisting of an array of smaller antenna elements.

=== Leaky wave antenna ===
A leaky wave antenna uses a leaking transmission line to obtain radiation.

=== Spiral antenna ===
A spiral antenna, configured in the shape of a spiral, serves as a radio frequency antenna. It can function independently or as a feeder for satellite communication reflector antennas. It ensures excellent impedance matching and radiation pattern performance across the entire operating frequency band.
