= Q band =

Frequency range on the electromagnetic spectrum

Waveguide Q band
- Frequency range: 33 to 50 GHz
- Related bands: K_{a} / V bands (IEEE); K / L bands (NATO); SHF / EHF (ITU)

The Q band is a range of frequencies contained in the microwave region of the electromagnetic spectrum. Common usage places this range between 33 and 50 GHz, but may vary depending on the source using the term. The foregoing range corresponds to the recommended frequency band of operation of WR22 waveguides. These frequencies are equivalent to wavelengths between 6 mm and 9.1 mm in air/vacuum. The Q band is in the EHF range of the radio spectrum.

The term "Q band" does not have a consistently precise usage in the technical literature, but tends to be a concurrent subset of both the IEEE designated K_{a} band (26.5–40 GHz) and V band (40–75 GHz). Neither the IEEE nor the ITU-R recognize the Q band in their standards, which define the nomenclature of bands in the electromagnetic spectrum. The ISO recognizes the Q band; however, the range therefore defined is 36 to 46 GHz. Other ISO frequency band definitions do not precisely match the concurrent definitions of the IEEE and ITU-R.

The Q band is mainly used for satellite communications, terrestrial microwave communications and for radio astronomy studies such as the QUIET telescope. It is also used in automotive radar and in radar investigating the properties of the Earth's surface.
