= L band (NATO) =

NATO L band
- Frequency range: 40–60 GHz
- Wavelength range: 7.5–5 mm
- Related bands: K / V band (IEEE); SHF / EHF (ITU)

The NATO L band is the obsolete designation given to the radio frequencies from 40 to 60 GHz (equivalent to wavelengths between 7.5 and 5 mm) during the cold war period. Since 1992 frequency allocations, allotment and assignments are in line to NATO Joint Civil/Military Frequency Agreement (NJFA).

However, in order to identify military radio spectrum requirements, e.g. for crises management planning, training, Electronic warfare activities, or in military operations, this system is still in use.

| NATO LETTER BAND DESIGNATION | | | | BROADCASTING; BAND; DESIGNATION |
| NEW NOMENCLATURE | | OLD NOMENCLATURE | | BROADCASTING; BAND; DESIGNATION |
| BAND | FREQUENCY (MHz) | BAND | FREQUENCY (MHz) | BROADCASTING; BAND; DESIGNATION |
| A | 0 – 250 | I | 100 – 150 | Band I 47 – 68 MHz (TV) |
| A | 0 – 250 | I | 100 – 150 | Band II; 87.5 – 108 MHz (FM) |
| A | 0 – 250 | G | 150 – 225 | Band III; 174 – 230 MHz (TV) |
| B | 250 – 500 | P | 225 – 390 | |
| C | 500 – 1 000 | L | 390 – 1 550 | Band IV; 470 – 582 MHz (TV) |
| C | 500 – 1 000 | L | 390 – 1 550 | Band V 582 – 862 MHz (TV) |
| D | 1 000 – 2 000 | L | 390 – 1 550 | |
| D | 1 000 – 2 000 | S | 1 550 – 3 900 | |
| E | 2 000 – 3 000 | S | 1 550 – 3 900 | |
| F | 3 000 – 4 000 | S | 1 550 – 3 900 | |
| G | 4 000 – 6 000 | C | 3 900 – 6 200 | |
| H | 6 000 – 8 000 | X | 6 200 – 10 900 | |
| I | 8 000 – 10 000 | X | 6 200 – 10 900 | |
| J | 10 000 – 20 000 | Ku | 10 900 – 20 000 | |
| K | 20 000 – 40 000 | Ka | 20 000 – 36 000 | |
| L | 40 000 – 60 000 | Q | 36 000 – 46 000 | |
| L | 40 000 – 60 000 | V | 46 000 – 56 000 | |
| M | 60 000 – 100 000 | W | 56 000 – 100 000 | |
| US- MILITARY / SACLANT | | | | |
| N | 100 000 – 200 000 | | | |
| O | 100 000 – 200 000 | | | |
