= A band (NATO) =

Range of radio frequencies

NATO A band
- Frequency range: 0 to 250 MHz
- Wavelength range: ≥ 1.2 m

The NATO A band is the obsolete designation given to the radio frequencies from 0 to 250 MHz (equivalent to wavelengths from 1.2 m upwards) during the Cold War period. Since 1992, frequency allocations, allotment and assignments are in line with the NATO Joint Civil/Military Frequency Agreement. However, in order to identify military radio spectrum requirements, e.g. for crisis management planning, training, electronic warfare activities, or in military operations, this system is still in use.

== NATO radio spectrum designation ==
NATO letter band designation				Broadcasting band designation
New nomenclature		Old nomenclature		Broadcasting band designation
Band	Frequency (MHz)	Band	Frequency (MHz)	Broadcasting band designation
A	0–250	I	100–150	Band I 47–68 MHz (TV)
A	0–250	I	100–150	Band II; 87.5–108 MHz (FM)
A	0–250	G	150–225	Band III; 174–230 MHz (TV)
B	250–500	P	225–390	
C	500 – 1 000	L	390 – 1 550	Band IV; 470–582 MHz (TV)
C	500 – 1 000	L	390 – 1 550	Band V 582–862 MHz (TV)
D	1 000 – 2 000	L	390 – 1 550	
D	1 000 – 2 000	S	1 550 – 3 900	
E	2 000 – 3 000	S	1 550 – 3 900	
F	3 000 – 4 000	S	1 550 – 3 900	
G	4 000 – 6 000	C	3 900 – 6 200	
H	6 000 – 8 000	X	6 200 – 10 900	
I	8 000 – 10 000	X	6 200 – 10 900	
J	10 000 – 20 000	Ku	10 900 – 20 000	
K	20 000 – 40 000	Ka	20 000 – 36 000	
L	40 000 – 60 000	Q	36 000 – 46 000	
L	40 000 – 60 000	V	46 000 – 56 000	
M	60 000 – 100 000	W	56 000 – 100 000	
US-Military / SACLANT				
N	100 000 – 200 000			
O	100 000 – 200 000			

== Military usage ==
The A band is used for long-distance HF radio communication, tactical UHF radio communication, and aeronautical mobile service.
