= E band (NATO) =

Radio frequencies from 2000 to 3000 MHz

NATO E band
- Frequency range: 2–3 GHz
- Wavelength range: 15–10 cm
- Related bands: S (IEEE); UHF (ITU)

The NATO E band is a designation given to the radio frequencies from 2000 to 3000 MHz (equivalent to wavelengths between 15 and 10 cm) during the cold war period. Since 1992, detailed frequency allocations, allotment and assignments are in line with the NATO Joint Civil/Military Frequency Agreement (NJFA). However, in order to generically identify military radio spectrum requirements, e.g. for crisis management planning, training, electronic warfare activities, radar or in military operations, the NATO band system is often used.

NATO LETTER BAND DESIGNATION				BROADCASTING; BAND; DESIGNATION
NEW NOMENCLATURE		OLD NOMENCLATURE		BROADCASTING; BAND; DESIGNATION
BAND	FREQUENCY (MHz)	BAND	FREQUENCY (MHz)	BROADCASTING; BAND; DESIGNATION
A	0 – 250	I	100 – 150	Band I 47 – 68 MHz (TV)
A	0 – 250	I	100 – 150	Band II; 87.5 – 108 MHz (FM)
A	0 – 250	G	150 – 225	Band III; 174 – 230 MHz (TV)
B	250 – 500	P	225 – 390	
C	500 – 1 000	L	390 – 1 550	Band IV; 470 – 582 MHz (TV)
C	500 – 1 000	L	390 – 1 550	Band V 582 – 862 MHz (TV)
D	1 000 – 2 000	L	390 – 1 550	
D	1 000 – 2 000	S	1 550 – 3 900	
E	2 000 – 3 000	S	1 550 – 3 900	
F	3 000 – 4 000	S	1 550 – 3 900	
G	4 000 – 6 000	C	3 900 – 6 200	
H	6 000 – 8 000	X	6 200 – 10 900	
I	8 000 – 10 000	X	6 200 – 10 900	
J	10 000 – 20 000	Ku	10 900 – 20 000	
K	20 000 – 40 000	Ka	20 000 – 36 000	
L	40 000 – 60 000	Q	36 000 – 46 000	
L	40 000 – 60 000	V	46 000 – 56 000	
M	60 000 – 100 000	W	56 000 – 100 000	
US- MILITARY / SACLANT				
N	100 000 – 200 000			
O	100 000 – 200 000			
