= M band (NATO) =

NATO M band
- Frequency range: 60–100 GHz
- Wavelength range: 5–3 mm
- Related bands: V / W (IEEE); EHF (ITU)

The NATO M band is the obsolete designation given to the radio frequencies from 60 to 100 GHz (equivalent to wavelengths between 5 and 3 mm) during the cold war period. Since 1992 frequency allocations, allotment and assignments are in line to NATO Joint Civil/Military Frequency Agreement (NJFA).

However, in order to identify military radio spectrum requirements, e.g. for crises management planning, training, Electronic warfare activities, or in military operations, this system is still in use.

The NATO M band is also a subset of the EHF band as defined by the ITU. It intersects with the V (50–75 GHz) and W band (75–110 GHz) of the older IEEE classification system.

NATO LETTER BAND DESIGNATION				BROADCASTING; BAND; DESIGNATION
NEW NOMENCLATURE		OLD NOMENCLATURE		BROADCASTING; BAND; DESIGNATION
BAND	FREQUENCY (MHz)	BAND	FREQUENCY (MHz)	BROADCASTING; BAND; DESIGNATION
A	0 – 250	I	100 – 150	Band I 47 – 68 MHz (TV)
A	0 – 250	I	100 – 150	Band II; 87.5 – 108 MHz (FM)
A	0 – 250	G	150 – 225	Band III; 174 – 230 MHz (TV)
B	250 – 500	P	225 – 390	
C	500 – 1 000	L	390 – 1 550	Band IV; 470 – 582 MHz (TV)
C	500 – 1 000	L	390 – 1 550	Band V 582 – 862 MHz (TV)
D	1 000 – 2 000	L	390 – 1 550	
D	1 000 – 2 000	S	1 550 – 3 900	
E	2 000 – 3 000	S	1 550 – 3 900	
F	3 000 – 4 000	S	1 550 – 3 900	
G	4 000 – 6 000	C	3 900 – 6 200	
H	6 000 – 8 000	X	6 200 – 10 900	
I	8 000 – 10 000	X	6 200 – 10 900	
J	10 000 – 20 000	Ku	10 900 – 20 000	
K	20 000 – 40 000	Ka	20 000 – 36 000	
L	40 000 – 60 000	Q	36 000 – 46 000	
L	40 000 – 60 000	V	46 000 – 56 000	
M	60 000 – 100 000	W	56 000 – 100 000	
US- MILITARY / SACLANT				
N	100 000 – 200 000			
O	100 000 – 200 000			
