= Band VI =

Radio frequency band

Band VI is a radio frequency range within the super high frequency (SHF) part of the electromagnetic spectrum.

One source states that Band VI ranges from 11.7 to 12.5 GHz, whilst other earlier sources state the range as 11.7 to 12.7 GHz. The band is used for direct-broadcast satellite (DBS) and amateur radio astronomy. Band VI overlaps with the K_{u} band.
