= K band (IEEE) =

Radio frequency band

IEEE K-band
- Frequency range: 18–27 GHz
- Wavelength range: 1.67–1.11 cm
- Related bands: J- / K-bands (NATO); SHF (ITU)

The IEEE K-band is a portion of the radio spectrum in the microwave range of frequencies from 12 to 40 gigahertz (GHz), but is often used to refer to the middle subdivision of the range (18 to 27 gigahertz). The range of the K-band between 18 and 26.5 GHz are absorbed by water vapor in the atmosphere due to its resonance peak at 22.24 GHz, 1.35 cm (0.53 in). Therefore these frequencies experience high atmospheric attenuation and cannot be used for long-distance applications. For this reason, the original K-band has been split into three bands: Ka-band, K-band, and Ku-band as detailed below.

The K stands for Kurz, the German word for 'short'.

== Subdivisions ==
Because of the water vapor absorption peak in the center of the band, the IEEE K-band is conventionally divided into three sub-bands:

- Ku-band (K-under band, 12–18 GHz): mainly used for satellite communications, direct-broadcast satellite television, terrestrial microwave communications, and radar, especially police traffic speed detectors.
- K-band (18–27 GHz): due to the 22 GHz water vapor absorption line, this band has high atmospheric attenuation and is only useful for short-range applications.
- Ka-band (K-above band, 26.5–40 GHz): mainly used for satellite communications, radar and experimental communications. NASA's Kepler space telescope is the first NASA mission to use Ka-band NASA Deep Space Network (NASA DSN) communications.

== Amateur radio ==
The Radio Regulations of the International Telecommunication Union (ITU) allow amateur radio and amateur satellite operations in the frequency range 24.000 GHz to 24.250 GHz, which is known as the 1.2-centimeter band. It is also referred to as the K-band by AMSAT.

== See also ==
- K band (infrared)
- K band (NATO)
