= Ultra high frequency =

Electromagnetic spectrum 300–3000 MHz

Ultra high frequency (ITU)
- Frequency range: 300 MHz to 3 GHz
- Wavelength range: 1 m to 10 cm
- Related bands: B / C / D / E bands (NATO); UHF and L / S bands (IEEE)

Ultra high frequency (IEEE)
- Frequency range: 300 MHz to 1 GHz
- Wavelength range: 1 m to 30 cm
- Related bands: UHF (ITU); B / C bands (NATO)

Ultra high frequency (UHF) is the ITU designation for radio frequencies in the range between 300 megahertz (MHz) and 3 gigahertz (GHz), also known as the decimetre band as the wavelengths range from one meter to one tenth of a meter (one decimeter). Radio waves with frequencies above the UHF band fall into the super-high frequency (SHF) or microwave frequency range. Lower frequency signals fall into the VHF (very high frequency) or lower bands.

UHF radio waves propagate mainly by line of sight; they are blocked by hills and large buildings although the transmission through building walls is strong enough for indoor reception. They are used for television broadcasting, cell phones, satellite communication including GPS, personal radio services including Wi-Fi and Bluetooth, walkie-talkies, cordless phones, satellite phones, and numerous other applications.

The IEEE defines the UHF radar band as frequencies between 300 MHz and 1 GHz. Two other IEEE radar bands overlap the ITU UHF band: the L band between 1 and 2 GHz and the S band between 2 and 4 GHz.

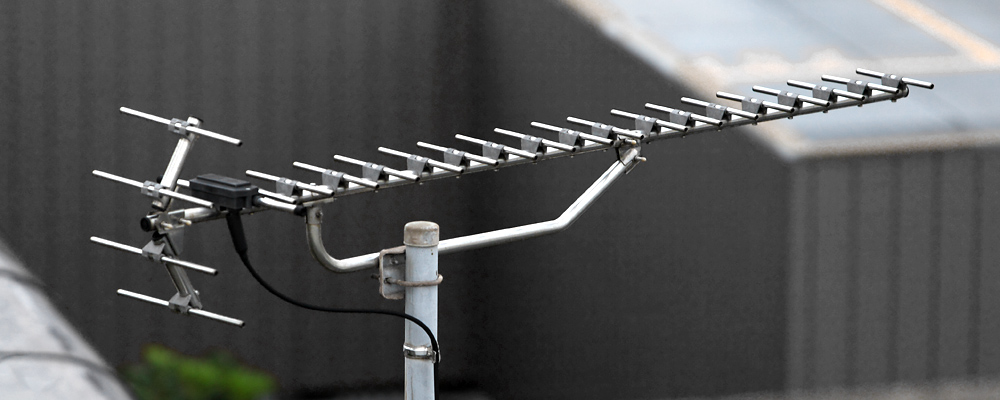
UHF television antenna on a residence. This type of antenna, called a Yagi–Uda antenna, is widely used at UHF frequencies.

== Propagation characteristics ==
Radio waves in the UHF band travel almost entirely by line-of-sight propagation (LOS) and ground reflection; unlike in the HF band there is little to no reflection from the ionosphere (skywave propagation), or ground wave. UHF radio waves are blocked by hills and cannot travel beyond the horizon, but can penetrate foliage and buildings for indoor reception. Since the wavelengths of UHF waves are comparable to the size of buildings, trees, vehicles and other common objects, reflection and diffraction from these objects can cause fading due to multipath propagation, especially in built-up urban areas. Atmospheric moisture reduces, or attenuates, the strength of UHF signals over long distances, and the attenuation increases with frequency. UHF TV signals are generally more degraded by moisture than lower bands, such as VHF TV signals.

As the visual horizon sets the maximum range of UHF transmission to between 30 and 40 miles (48 to 64 km) or less, depending on local terrain, the same frequency channels can be reused by other users in neighboring geographic areas (frequency reuse). Radio repeaters are used to retransmit UHF signals when a distance greater than the line of sight is required.

Occasionally when conditions are right, UHF radio waves can travel long distances by tropospheric ducting as the atmosphere warms and cools throughout the day.

== Antennas ==
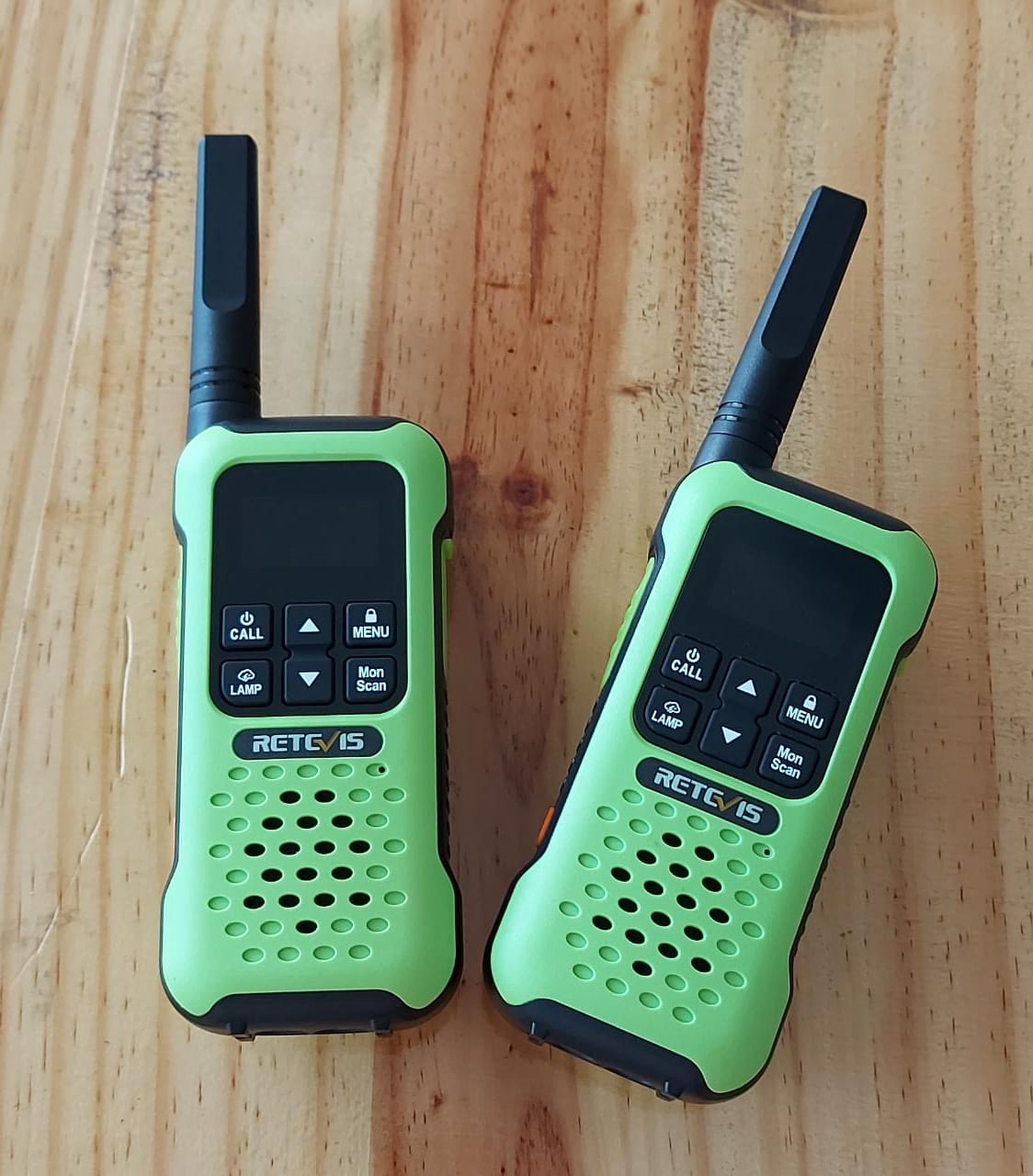
Retevis GMRS two-way radios operating on 462 and 467 MHz in the UHF band, showing the short antennas used

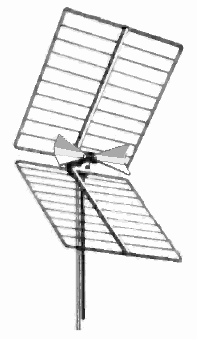
Corner reflector UHF-TV antenna from 1950s

The length of an antenna is related to the length of the radio waves used. Due to the short wavelengths, UHF antennas are conveniently stubby and short; at UHF frequencies a quarter-wave monopole, the most common omnidirectional antenna is between 2.5 and 25 cm long. UHF wavelengths are short enough that efficient transmitting antennas are small enough to mount on handheld and mobile devices, so these frequencies are used for two-way land mobile radio systems, such as walkie-talkies, two-way radios in vehicles, and for portable wireless devices; cordless phones and cell phones. Omnidirectional UHF antennas used on mobile devices are usually short whips, sleeve dipoles, rubber ducky antennas or the planar inverted F antenna (PIFA) used in cellphones. Higher gain omnidirectional UHF antennas can be made of collinear arrays of dipoles and are used for mobile base stations and cellular base station antennas.

The short wavelengths also allow high gain antennas to be conveniently small. High gain antennas for point-to-point communication links and UHF television reception are usually Yagi, log periodic, corner reflectors, or reflective array antennas. At the top end of the band, slot antennas and parabolic dishes become practical. For satellite communication, helical and turnstile antennas are used since satellites typically employ circular polarization which is not sensitive to the relative orientation of the transmitting and receiving antennas. For television broadcasting specialized vertical radiators that are mostly modifications of the slot antenna or reflective array antenna are used: the slotted cylinder, zig-zag, and panel antennas.

== Applications ==
UHF television broadcasting channels are used for digital television, although much of the former bandwidth has been reallocated to land mobile radio system, trunked radio and mobile telephone use.

Since at UHF frequencies transmitting antennas are small enough to install on portable devices, the UHF spectrum is used worldwide for land mobile radio systems, two-way radios used for voice communication for commercial, industrial, public safety, and military purposes. Examples of personal radio services are GMRS, PMR446, and UHF CB.

The most rapidly-expanding use of the band is Wi-Fi (wireless LAN) networks in homes, offices, and public places. Wi-Fi IEEE 802.11 low band operates between 2412 and 2484 MHz. A second widespread use is for cellphones, allowing handheld mobile phones to be connected to the public switched telephone network and the Internet. Current 3G and 4G cellular networks use UHF, the frequencies varying among different carriers and countries. Satellite phones also use this frequency in the L band and S band.

== Examples of UHF frequency allocations ==
=== Australia ===
- 406–406.1 MHz: Mobile satellite service
- 450.4875–451.5125 MHz: Fixed point-to-point link
- 457.50625–459.9875 MHz: Land mobile service
- 476–477 MHz: UHF citizens band (land mobile service)
- 503–694 MHz: UHF channels for television broadcasting

=== Canada ===
- 430–450 MHz: Amateur radio (70 cm band)
- 470–806 MHz: Terrestrial television (with select channels in the 600 and 700 MHz bands left vacant)
- 1452–1492 MHz: Digital Audio Broadcasting (L band)
- Many other frequency assignments for Canada and Mexico are similar to their US counterparts

=== France ===
- 380-400 MHz: Terrestrial Trunked Radio for Police
- 430-440 MHz: Amateur radio (70 cm band)
- 446.0–446.2 MHz : European unlicensed PMR service, PMR446
- 470-694 MHz: Terrestrial television

=== New Zealand ===
- 406.1–420 MHz: Land mobile service
- 430–440 MHz: Amateur radio (70 cm band) and amateur radio satellite
- 476–477 MHz: PRS Personal Radio Service (Land mobile service)
- 485–502 MHz: Analog and P25 emergency services use
- 510–622 MHz: Terrestrial television
- 960–1215 MHz: Aeronautical radionavigation
- 1240–1300 MHz: Amateur radio (23 cm band)

=== United Kingdom ===
- 380–399.9 MHz: Terrestrial Trunked Radio (TETRA) service for emergency use
- 430–440 MHz: Amateur radio (70 cm band)
- 446.0–446.2 MHz : European unlicensed PMR service, PMR446
- 457–464 MHz: Scanning telemetry and telecontrol, assigned mostly to the water, gas, and electricity industries
- 606–614 MHz: Radio microphones and radio-astronomy
- 470–862 MHz: Previously used for analogue TV channels 21–69 (until 2012).
  - Currently channels 21 to 37 and 39 to 48 are used for Freeview digital TV. Channels 55 to 56 were previously used by temporary muxes COM7 and COM8, channel 38 was used for radio astronomy but has been cleared to allow PMSE users access on a licensed, shared basis.
  - 694–790 MHz: i.e. channels 49 to 60 have been cleared, to allow these channels to be allocated for 5G cellular communication.
  - 791–862 MHz, i.e. channels 61 to 69 inclusive were previously used for licensed and shared wireless microphones (channel 69 only), has since been allocated to 4G cellular communications.
- 863–865 MHz: Used for licence-exempt wireless systems.
- 863–870 MHz: Short range devices, LPWAN IoT devices such as NarrowBand-IoT.
- 870–960 MHz: Cellular communications (GSM900 - Vodafone and O2 only) including GSM-R and future TETRA
- 1240–1325 MHz: Amateur radio (23 cm band)
- 1710–1880 MHz: 2G cellular communications (GSM1800)
- 1880–1900 MHz: DECT cordless telephone
- 1900–1980 MHz: 3G cellular communications (mobile phone uplink)
- 2110–2170 MHz: 3G cellular communications (base station downlink)
- 2310–2450 MHz: Amateur radio (13 cm band)

=== United States ===
UHF channels are used for digital television broadcasting on both over the air channels and cable television channels. Since 1962, UHF channel tuners (at the time, channels 14 to 83) have been required in television receivers by the All-Channel Receiver Act. However, because of their more limited range, and because few sets could receive them until older sets were replaced, UHF channels were less desirable to broadcasters than VHF channels (and licenses sold for lower prices).

A complete list of US television frequency allocations can be found at Pan-American television frequencies.

There is a considerable amount of lawful unlicensed activity (cordless phones, wireless networking) clustered around 900 MHz and 2.4 GHz, regulated under Title 47 CFR Part 15. These ISM bands—frequencies with a higher unlicensed power permitted for use originally by industrial, scientific and medical apparatus—are now some of the most crowded in the spectrum because they are open to everyone. The 2.45 GHz frequency is the standard for use by microwave ovens, adjacent to the frequencies allocated for Bluetooth network devices.

The spectrum from 806 MHz to 890 MHz (UHF channels 70 to 83) was taken away from TV broadcast services in 1983, primarily for analog mobile telephony.

In 2009, as part of the transition from analog to digital over-the-air broadcast of television, the spectrum from 698 MHz to 806 MHz (UHF channels 52 to 69) was removed from TV broadcasting, making it available for other uses. Channel 55, for instance, was sold to Qualcomm for their MediaFLO service, which was later sold to AT&T, and discontinued in 2011. Some US broadcasters had been offered incentives to vacate this channel early, permitting its immediate mobile use. The FCC's scheduled auction for this newly available spectrum was completed in March 2008.

- 225–420 MHz: Government use, including meteorology, military aviation, and federal two-way use
- 420–450 MHz: Government radiolocation, amateur radio satellite and amateur radio (70 cm band), MedRadio
- 450–470 MHz: UHF business band, General Mobile Radio Service, and Family Radio Service 2-way "walkie-talkies", public safety
- 470–512 MHz: Low-band TV channels 14 to 20 (shared with public safety land mobile 2-way radio in 12 major metropolitan areas scheduled to relocate to 700 MHz band by 2023)
- 512–608 MHz: Medium-band TV channels 21 to 36
- 608–614 MHz: Channel 37 used for radio astronomy and wireless medical telemetry
- 614–698 MHz: Mobile broadband shared with TV channels 38 to 51 auctioned in April 2017. TV stations were relocated by 2020.
  - 617–652 MHz: Mobile broadband service downlink
  - 652–663 MHz: Wireless microphones (higher priority) and unlicensed devices (lower priority)
  - 663–698 MHz: Mobile broadband service uplink
- 698–806 MHz: Was auctioned in March 2008; bidders got full use after the transition to digital TV was completed on June 12, 2009 (formerly high-band UHF TV channels 52 to 69) and recently modified in 2021 for 5G UHF transmission bandwidth for 'over the air' channels 2 through 69 (virtual 1 through 36).
- 806–816 MHz: Public safety and commercial 2-way (formerly TV channels 70 to 72)
- 817–824 MHz: ESMR band for wideband mobile services (mobile phone) (formerly public safety and commercial 2-way)
- 824–849 MHz: Cellular A and B franchises, terminal (mobile phone) (formerly TV channels 73 to 77)
- 849–851 MHz: Commercial aviation air-ground systems
- 851–861 MHz: Public safety and commercial 2-way (formerly TV channels 77 to 80)
- 862–869 MHz: ESMR band for wideband mobile services (base station) (formerly public safety and commercial 2-way)
- 869–894 MHz: Cellular A and B franchises, base station (formerly TV channels 80 to 83)
- 894–896 MHz: Commercial aviation air-ground systems
- 896–901 MHz: Commercial 2-way radio
- 901–902 MHz: Narrowband PCS: commercial narrowband mobile services
- 902–928 MHz: ISM band, amateur radio (33 cm band), cordless phones and stereo, radio-frequency identification, datalinks
- 928–929 MHz: SCADA, alarm monitoring, meter reading systems and other narrowband services for a company's internal use
- 929–930 MHz: Pagers
- 930–931 MHz: Narrowband PCS: commercial narrowband mobile services
- 931–932 MHz: Pagers
- 932–935 MHz: Fixed microwave services: distribution of video, audio and other data
- 935–940 MHz: Commercial 2-way radio
- 940–941 MHz: Narrowband PCS: commercial narrowband mobile services
- 941–960 MHz: Mixed studio-transmitter fixed links, SCADA, other.
- 960–1215 MHz: Aeronautical radionavigation
- 1240–1300 MHz: Amateur radio (23 cm band)
- 1300–1350 MHz: Long range radar systems
- 1350–1390 MHz: Military air traffic control and mobile telemetry systems at test ranges
- 1390–1395 MHz: Proposed wireless medical telemetry service. TerreStar failed to provide service by the required deadline.
- 1395–1400 MHz: Wireless medical telemetry service
- 1400–1427 MHz: Earth exploration, radio astronomy, and space research
- 1427–1432 MHz: Wireless medical telemetry service
- 1432–1435 MHz: Proposed wireless medical telemetry service. TerreStar failed to provide service by the required deadline.
- 1435–1525 MHz: Military use mostly for aeronautical mobile telemetry (therefore not available for Digital Audio Broadcasting, unlike Canada/Europe)
- 1525–1559 MHz: Skyterra downlink (Ligado is seeking FCC permission for terrestrial use)
  - 1526–1536 MHz: proposed Ligado downlink
  - 1536–1559 MHz: proposed guard band
- 1559–1610 MHz: Radio Navigation Satellite Services (RNSS) Upper L-band
  - 1563–1587 MHz: GPS L1 band
  - 1593–1610 MHz: GLONASS G1 band
  - 1559–1591 MHz: Galileo E1 band (overlapping with GPS L1)
- 1610–1660.5 MHz: Mobile Satellite Service
  - 1610–1618: Globalstar uplink
  - 1618–1626.5 MHz: Iridium uplink and downlink
  - 1626.5–1660.5 MHz: Skyterra uplink (Ligado is seeking FCC permission for terrestrial use)
    - 1627.5–1637.5 MHz: proposed Ligado uplink 1
    - 1646.5–1656.5 MHz: proposed Ligado uplink 2
- 1660.5–1668.4 MHz: Radio astronomy observations. Transmitting is not permitted.
- 1668.4–1670 MHz: Radio astronomy observations. Weather balloons may utilize the spectrum after an advance notice.
- 1670–1675 MHz: Geostationary Operational Environmental Satellite transmissions to three Earth stations in Wallops Island, Virginia; Greenbelt, Maryland and Fairbanks, Alaska. Nationwide broadband service license in this range is held by a subsidiary of Crown Castle International Corp. who is trying to provide service in cooperation with Ligado Networks.
- 1675–1695 MHz: Meteorological federal users
- 1695–1780 MHz: AWS mobile phone uplink (UL) operating band
  - 1695–1755 MHz: AWS-3 blocks A1 and B1
  - 1710–1755 MHz: AWS-1 blocks A, B, C, D, E, F
  - 1755–1780 MHz: AWS-3 blocks G, H, I, J (various federal agencies transitioning by 2025)
- 1780–1850 MHz: exclusive federal use (Air Force satellite communications, Army's cellular-like communication system, other agencies)
- 1850–1920 MHz: PCS mobile phone—order is A, D, B, E, F, C, G, H blocks. A, B, C = 15 MHz; D, E, F, G, H = 5 MHz
- 1920–1930 MHz: DECT cordless telephone
- 1930–2000 MHz: PCS base stations—order is A, D, B, E, F, C, G, H blocks. A, B, C = 15 MHz; D, E, F, G, H = 5 MHz
- 2000–2020 MHz: lower AWS-4 downlink (mobile broadband)
- 2020–2110 MHz: Cable antenna relay service, local television transmission service, TV broadcast auxiliary service, Earth exploration satellite service
- 2110–2200 MHz: AWS mobile broadband downlink
  - 2110–2155 MHz: AWS-1 blocks A, B, C, D, E, F
  - 2155–2180 MHz: AWS-3 blocks G, H, I, J
  - 2180–2200 MHz: upper AWS-4
- 2200–2290 MHz: NASA satellite tracking, telemetry and control (space-to-Earth, space-to-space)
- 2290–2300 MHz: NASA Deep Space Network
- 2300–2305 MHz: Amateur radio (13 cm band, lower segment)
- 2305–2315 MHz: WCS mobile broadband service uplink blocks A and B
- 2315–2320 MHz: WCS block C (AT&T is pursuing smart grid deployment)
- 2320–2345 MHz: Satellite radio
- 2345–2350 MHz: WCS block D (AT&T is pursuing smart grid deployment)
- 2350–2360 MHz: WCS mobile broadband service downlink blocks A and B
- 2360–2390 MHz: Aircraft landing and safety systems
- 2390–2395 MHz: Aircraft landing and safety systems (secondary deployment in a dozen of airports), amateur radio otherwise
- 2395–2400 MHz: Amateur radio (13 cm band, upper segment)
- 2400–2483.5 MHz: ISM, IEEE 802.11, 802.11b, 802.11g, 802.11n wireless LAN, IEEE 802.15.4-2006, Bluetooth, radio-controlled aircraft (strictly for spread spectrum use), microwave ovens, Zigbee
- 2483.5–2495 MHz: Globalstar downlink and terrestrial low power service suitable for TD-LTE small cells
- 2495–2690 MHz: Educational broadcast and broadband radio Services
- 2690–2700 MHz: Receive-only range for radio astronomy and space research

== See also ==
- Digital Audio Broadcasting and its regional implementations
- Digital terrestrial television
- The Thing (listening device)
