= Extremely high frequency =

30–300 GHz range of the electromagnetic spectrum

- Frequency range: 30 to 300 GHz
- Wavelength range: 1 cm to 1 mm
- Related bands: L; M; N (NATO); V; W (IEEE)

Extremely high frequency (EHF) is the electromagnetic band from 30 to 300 gigahertz (GHz), as designated by the International Telecommunication Union (ITU) designation. It is in the microwave part of the radio spectrum, between the super high frequency band and the terahertz band. Radio waves in this band have wavelengths from ten to one millimeter (10–1 mm), so it is also called the millimeter band and radiation in this band is called millimeter waves (sometimes abbreviated MMW or mmWave). Some define mmWaves as starting at 24 GHz, thus covering the entire FR2 band (24.25 to 71 GHz), among others.

Compared to lower frequency bands, radio waves in this band have high atmospheric attenuation: they are absorbed by the gases in the atmosphere. Absorption increases with frequency until at the top end of the band the waves are attenuated to zero within a few meters. Absorption by humidity in the atmosphere is significant except in desert environments, and attenuation by rain (rain fade) is a serious problem even over short distances. However the short propagation range allows smaller frequency reuse distances than lower frequencies. The short wavelength allows modest size antennas to have a small beam width, further increasing frequency reuse potential. Millimeter waves are used for military fire-control radar, airport security scanners, short range wireless networks, and scientific research.

In a major new application of millimeter waves, certain frequency ranges near the bottom of the band are being used in the newest generation of cell phone networks, 5G networks. The design of millimeter-wave circuit and subsystems (such as antennas, power amplifiers, mixers and oscillators) also presents severe challenges to engineers due to semiconductor and process limitations, model limitations and poor Q factors of passive devices.

== Propagation ==
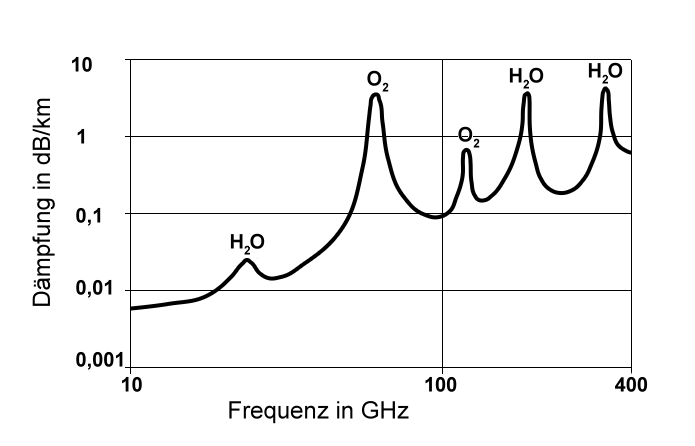
Atmospheric attenuation in dB/km as a function of frequency over the extremely high frequency band. Peaks in absorption at specific frequencies are a problem, due to atmosphere constituents such as water vapour (H_{2}O) and molecular oxygen (O_{2}). The vertical scale is double logarithmic, as dB are themselves logarithmic.

Millimeter waves propagate solely by line-of-sight paths. They are not refracted by the ionosphere nor do they travel along the Earth as ground waves as lower frequency radio waves do. At typical power densities they are blocked by building walls and suffer significant attenuation passing through foliage. Absorption by atmospheric gases is a significant factor throughout the band and increases with frequency. However, this absorption is maximum at a few specific absorption lines, mainly those of oxygen at 60 GHz and water vapor at 24 GHz and 184 GHz. At frequencies in the "windows" between these absorption peaks, millimeter waves have much less atmospheric attenuation and greater range, so many applications use these frequencies. Millimeter wavelengths are the same order of size as raindrops, so precipitation causes additional attenuation due to scattering (rain fade) as well as absorption. The high free space loss and atmospheric absorption limit useful propagation to a few kilometers. Thus, they are useful for densely packed communications networks such as personal area networks that improve spectrum utilization through frequency reuse.

Millimeter waves show "optical" propagation characteristics and can be reflected and focused by small metal surfaces and dielectric lenses around 5 to 30 cm (2 inches to 1 foot) diameter. Because their wavelengths are often much smaller than the equipment that manipulates them, the techniques of geometric optics can be used. Diffraction is less than at lower frequencies, although millimeter waves can be diffracted by building edges. At millimeter wavelengths, surfaces appear rougher so diffuse reflection increases. Multipath propagation, particularly reflection from indoor walls and surfaces, causes serious fading. Doppler shift of frequency can be significant even at pedestrian speeds. In portable devices, shadowing due to the human body is a problem. Since the waves penetrate clothing and their small wavelength allows them to reflect from small metal objects they are used in millimeter wave scanners for airport security scanning.

== Applications ==
=== Scientific research ===
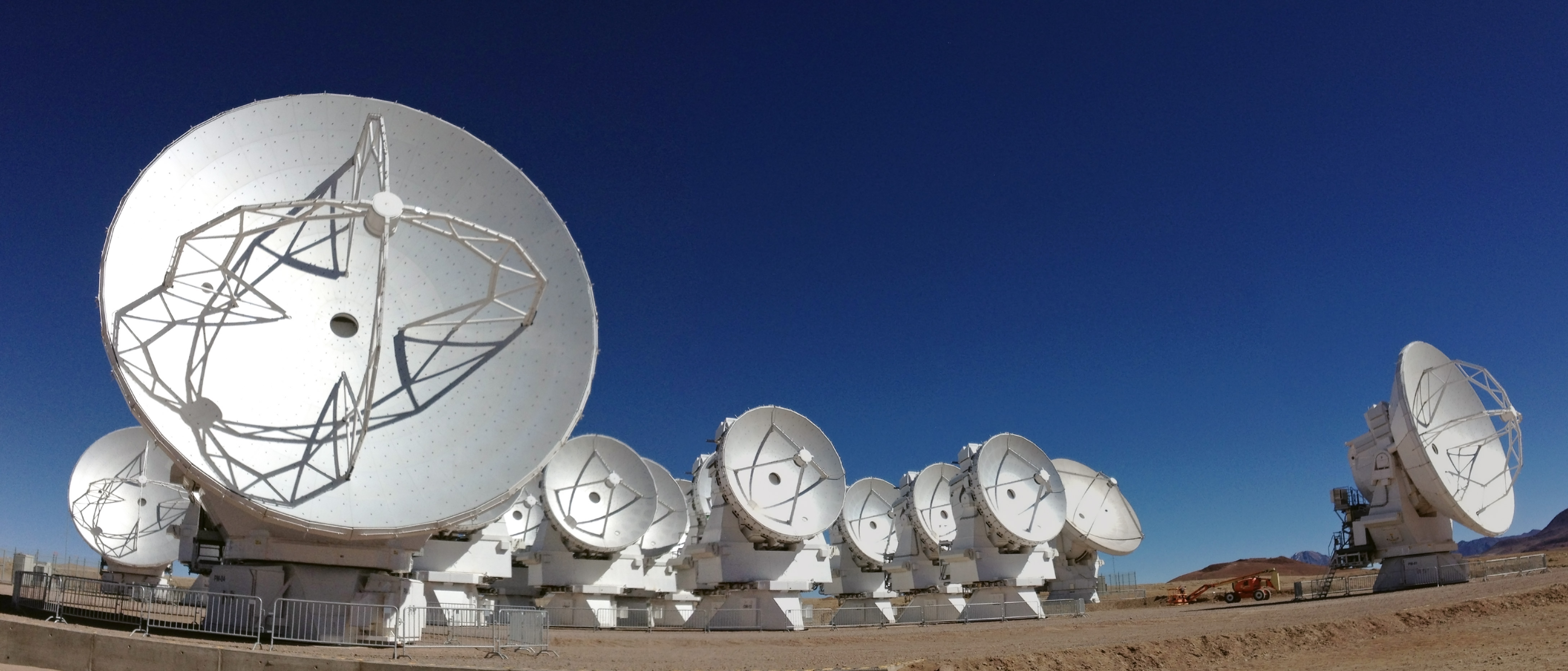
Part of the Atacama Large Millimeter Array (ALMA), Chile, America, a millimeter wave radio telescope

This band is commonly used in radio astronomy and remote sensing. Ground-based radio astronomy is limited to high altitude sites such as Kitt Peak and Atacama Large Millimeter Array (ALMA) due to atmospheric absorption issues.

Satellite-based remote sensing near 60 GHz can determine temperature in the upper atmosphere by measuring radiation emitted from oxygen molecules that is a function of temperature and pressure. The International Telecommunication Union non-exclusive passive frequency allocation at 57–59.3 GHz is used for atmospheric monitoring in meteorological and climate sensing applications and is important for these purposes due to the properties of oxygen absorption and emission in Earth's atmosphere. Currently operational U.S. satellite sensors such as the Advanced Microwave Sounding Unit (AMSU) on one NASA satellite (Aqua) and four NOAA (15–18) satellites and the special sensor microwave/imager (SSMI/S) on Department of Defense satellite F-16 make use of this frequency range.

=== Telecommunications ===
In the United States, the band 36.0–40.0 GHz is used for licensed high-speed microwave data links, and the 60 GHz band can be used for unlicensed short range (1.7 km) data links with data throughputs up to 2.5 Gbit/s. It is used commonly in flat terrain.

The 71–76, 81–86 and 92–95 GHz bands are also used for point-to-point high-bandwidth communication links. These higher frequencies do not suffer from oxygen absorption, but require a transmitting license in the US from the Federal Communications Commission (FCC). There are plans for 10 Gbit/s links using these frequencies as well. In the case of the 92–95 GHz band, a small 100 MHz range has been reserved for space-borne radios, limiting this reserved range to a transmission rate of under a few gigabits per second.

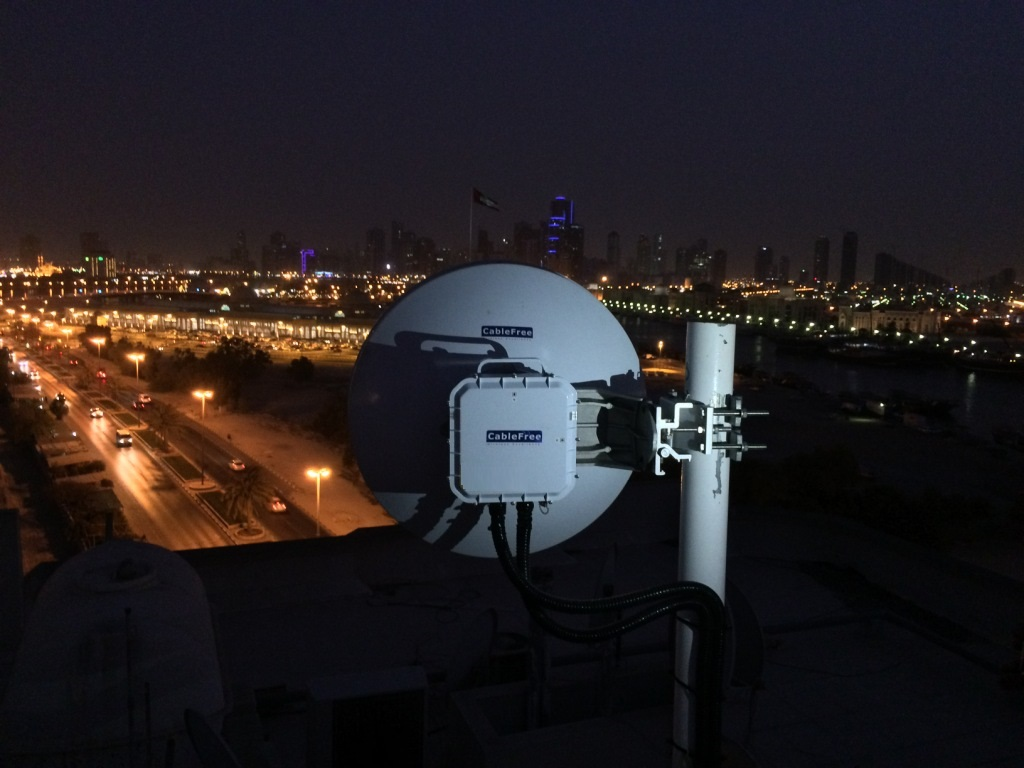
A CableFree MMW link installed in the UAE installed for Safe City applications, providing 1 Gbit/s capacity between sites. The links are fast to deploy and have a lower cost than fibre optics.

The band is essentially undeveloped and available for use in a broad range of new products and services, including high-speed, point-to-point wireless local area networks and broadband Internet access. WirelessHD is another recent technology that operates near the 60 GHz range. Highly directional, "pencil-beam" signal characteristics permit different systems to operate close to one another without causing interference. Potential applications include radar systems with very high resolution.

The Wi-Fi standards IEEE 802.11ad and IEEE 802.11ay operate in the 60 GHz (V band) spectrum to achieve data transfer rates as high as 7 Gbit/s and at least 20 Gbit/s, respectively.

Uses of the millimeter wave bands include point-to-point communications, intersatellite links, and point-to-multipoint communications. In 2013 it was speculated that there were plans to use millimeter waves in future 5G mobile phones. In addition, use of millimeter wave bands for vehicular communication is also emerging as an attractive solution to support (semi-)autonomous vehicular communications.

Shorter wavelengths in this band permit the use of smaller antennas to achieve the same high directivity and high gain as larger ones in lower bands. The immediate consequence of this high directivity, coupled with the high free space loss at these frequencies, is the possibility of a more efficient use of frequencies for point-to-multipoint applications. Since a greater number of highly directive antennas can be placed in a given area, the net result is greater frequency reuse, and higher density of users. The high usable channel capacity in this band might allow it to serve some applications that would otherwise use fiber-optic communication or very short links such as for the interconnect of circuit boards.

=== Weapons systems ===
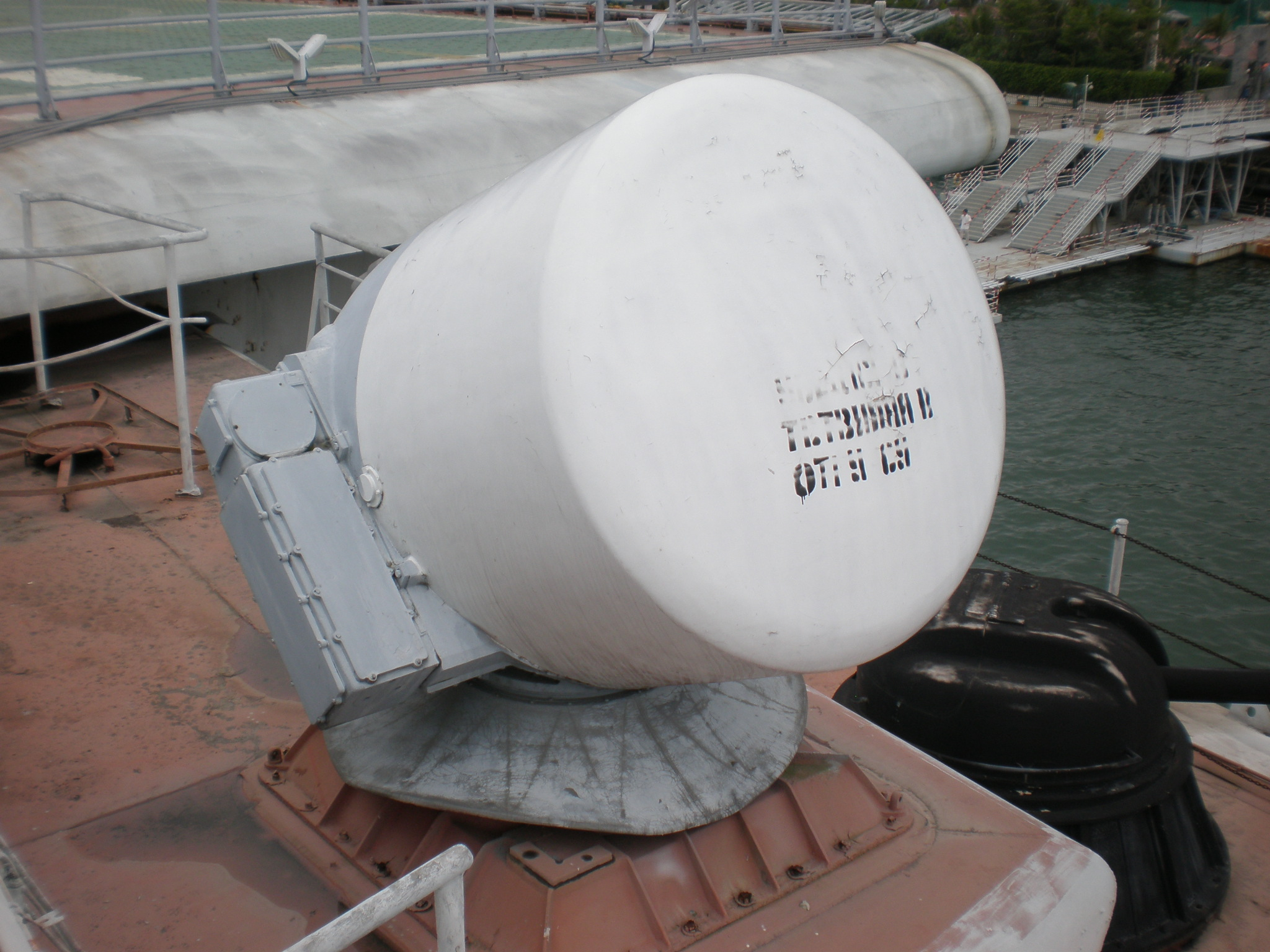
Millimeter wave fire control radar for CIWS gun on Soviet aircraft carrier Minsk, Russia

Millimeter wave radar is used in short-range fire-control radar in tanks and aircraft, and automated guns (CIWS) on naval ships to shoot down incoming missiles. The small wavelength of millimeter waves allows them to track the stream of outgoing bullets as well as the target, allowing the computer fire control system to change the aim to bring them together.

With Raytheon the U.S. Air Force has developed a nonlethal antipersonnel weapon system called Active Denial System (ADS) which emits a beam of millimeter radio waves with a wavelength of 3 mm (frequency of 95 GHz). The weapon causes a person in the beam to feel an intense burning pain, as if their skin is going to catch fire. The military version had an output power of 100 kilowatts (kW), and a smaller law enforcement version, called Silent Guardian that was developed by Raytheon later, had an output power of 30 kW.

=== Security screening ===
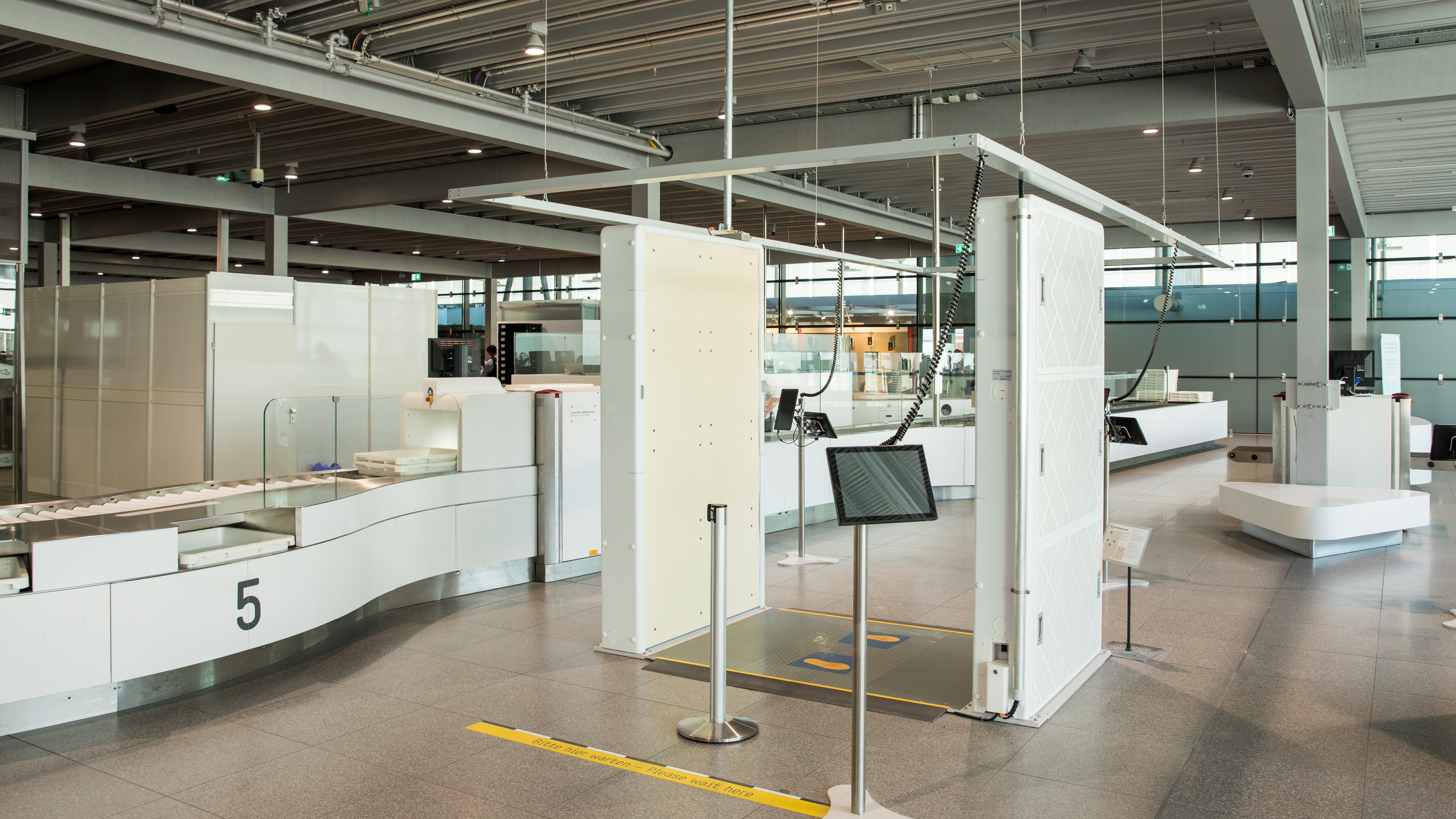
Millimeter wave security scanner at Bonn airport

Clothing and other organic materials are transparent to millimeter waves of certain frequencies, so a recent application has been scanners to detect weapons and other dangerous objects carried under clothing, for applications such as airport security. Privacy advocates are concerned about the use of this technology because, in some cases, it allows screeners to see airport passengers as if without clothing.

The TSA has deployed millimeter wave scanners to many major airports.

Prior to a software upgrade the technology did not mask any part of the bodies of the people who were being scanned. However, passengers' faces were deliberately masked by the system. The photos were screened by technicians in a closed room, then deleted immediately upon search completion. Privacy advocates are concerned. "We're getting closer and closer to a required strip-search to board an airplane," said Barry Steinhardt of the American Civil Liberties Union. To address this issue, upgrades have eliminated the need for an officer in a separate viewing area. The new software generates a generic image of a human. There is no anatomical differentiation between male and female on the image, and if an object is detected, the software only presents a yellow box in the area. If the device does not detect anything of interest, no image is presented. Passengers can decline scanning and be screened via a metal detector and patted down.

According to Farran Technologies, a manufacturer of one model of the millimeter wave scanner, the technology exists to extend the search area to as far as 50 meters beyond the scanning area which would allow security workers to scan a large number of people without their awareness that they are being scanned.

=== Thickness gauging ===
Recent studies at the University of Leuven have proven that millimeter waves can also be used as a non-nuclear thickness gauge in various industries. Millimeter waves provide a clean and contact-free way of detecting variations in thickness. Practical applications for the technology focus on plastics extrusion, paper manufacturing, glass production and mineral wool production.

=== Medicine ===
Low intensity (usually 10 mW/cm^{2} or less) electromagnetic radiation of extremely high frequency may be used in human medicine for the treatment of diseases. For example, "A brief, low-intensity MMW exposure can change cell growth and proliferation rates, activity of enzymes, state of cell genetic apparatus, function of excitable membranes and peripheral receptors." This treatment is particularly associated with the range of 40–70 GHz. This type of treatment may be called millimeter wave therapy or extremely high frequency therapy. This treatment is associated with eastern European nations (e.g., former USSR nations). The Russian Journal Millimeter waves in biology and medicine studies the scientific basis and clinical applications of millimeter wave therapy.

=== Police speed radar ===
Traffic police use speed-detecting radar guns in the Ka-band (33.4–36.0 GHz).

== History ==
Millimeter-length electromagnetic waves were first investigated by Jagadish Chandra Bose, who generated waves of frequency up to 60 GHz during experiments in 1894–1896.

== See also ==
- Electromagnetic shielding
- Journal of Infrared, Millimeter, and Terahertz Waves
- Knife-edge effect
- Microwave
- Terahertz radiation
- Microwave Analog Signal Processing
- mmWave sensing
