= W band =

Microwave part of the electromagnetic spectrum

IEEE W band
- Frequency range: 75 – 110 GHz
- Wavelength range: 4 – 2.73 mm
- Related bands: M (NATO); EHF (ITU)

The W band of the microwave part of the electromagnetic spectrum ranges from 75 to 110 GHz, wavelength ≈2.7–4 mm. It sits above the U.S. IEEE-designated V band (40–75 GHz) in frequency, and overlaps the NATO designated M band (60–100 GHz). The W band is used for satellite communications, millimeter-wave radar research, military radar targeting and tracking applications, and some non-military applications.

== Radar ==
A number of passive millimeter-wave cameras for concealed weapons detection operate at 94 GHz. A frequency around 77 GHz is used for automotive cruise control radar. The atmospheric radio window at 94 GHz is used for imaging millimeter-wave radar applications in astronomy, defense, and security applications.

== Heat ray ==
Less-than-lethal weaponry exists that uses millimeter waves to heat a thin layer of human skin to an intolerable temperature so as to make the targeted person move away. A two-second burst of the 95 GHz focused beam heats the skin to a temperature of 130 °F (54 °C) at a depth of 1/64 of an inch (0.40 mm). The United States Air Force and Marines are currently using this type of Active Denial System.

== Communications ==
In terms of communications capability, W band offers high data rate throughput when used at high altitudes and in space. (The 71–76 GHz / 81–86 GHz segment of the W band is allocated by the International Telecommunication Union to satellite services.) Because of increasing spectrum and orbit congestion at lower frequencies, W-band satellite allocations are of increasing interest to commercial satellite operators, especially the Starlink satellite constellations which have implemented capabilities in these bands.
