= Super high frequency =

Range 3-30 GHz of the electromagnetic spectrum

- Frequency range: 3 to 30 GHz
- Wavelength range: 10 to 1 cm
- Related bands: F; G; H; I; J; K (NATO); S; C; X; K_{u}; K; K_{a} (IEEE)

Super high frequency (SHF) is the ITU designation for radio frequencies (RF) in the range between 3 and 30 gigahertz (GHz). This band of frequencies is also known as the centimetre band or centimetre wave as the wavelengths range from one to ten centimetres. These frequencies fall within the microwave band, so radio waves with these frequencies are called microwaves. The small wavelength of microwaves allows them to be directed in narrow beams by aperture antennas such as parabolic dishes and horn antennas, so they are used for point-to-point communication, data links, and for radar. This frequency range is used for most radar transmitters, wireless LANs, satellite communication, microwave radio relay links, satellite phones (S band), and numerous short range terrestrial data links. They are also used for heating in industrial microwave heating, medical diathermy, microwave hyperthermy to treat cancer, and to cook food in microwave ovens.

Frequencies in the SHF range are often referred to by their IEEE radar band designations: S, C, X, K_{u}, K, or K_{a} band, or by similar NATO or EU designations.

== Propagation ==
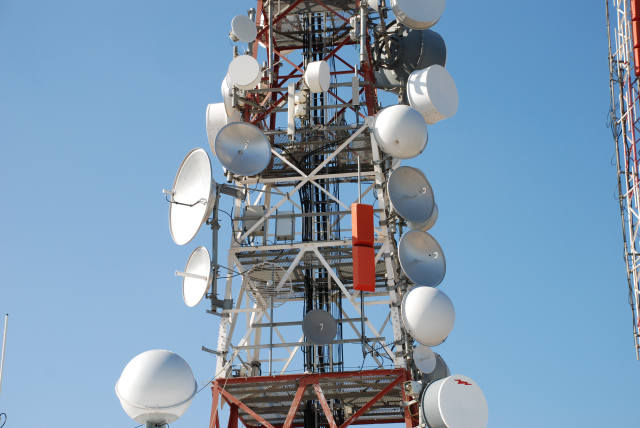
A variety of parabolic antennas on a communications tower in Australia for point-to-point microwave communication links. Some have white plastic radomes over their apertures to protect against rain.

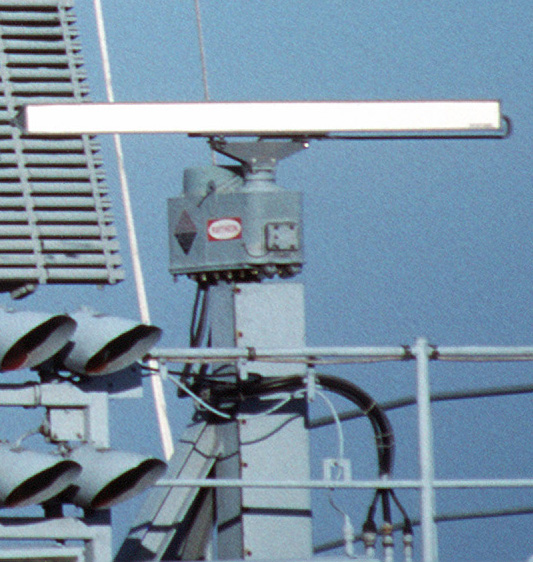
X-band (8 - 12 GHz) marine radar antenna on a ship. The rotating bar sweeps a vertical fan-shaped beam of microwaves around the water surface to the horizon, detecting nearby ships and other obstructions

Microwaves propagate solely by line of sight; because of the small refraction due to their short wavelength, the groundwave and ionospheric reflection (skywave or "skip" propagation) seen with lower frequency radio waves do not occur. Although in some cases they can penetrate building walls enough for useful reception, unobstructed rights of way cleared to the first Fresnel zone are usually required. Wavelengths are small enough at microwave frequencies that the antenna can be much larger than a wavelength, allowing highly directional (high gain) antennas to be built which can produce narrow beams. Therefore, they are used in point-to-point terrestrial communications links, limited by the visual horizon to 30–40 miles (48–64 km). Such high gain antennas allow frequency reuse by nearby transmitters. They are also used for communication with spacecraft since the waves are not refracted (bent) when passing through the ionosphere like lower frequencies.

The wavelength of SHF waves creates strong reflections from metal objects the size of automobiles, aircraft, and ships, and other vehicles. This and the narrow beamwidths possible with high gain antennas and the low atmospheric attenuation as compared with higher frequencies make SHF the main frequencies used in radar. Attenuation and scattering by moisture in the atmosphere increase with frequency, limiting the use of high SHF frequencies for long range applications.

Small amounts of microwave energy are randomly scattered by water vapor molecules in the troposphere. This is used in troposcatter communications systems, operating at a few GHz, to communicate beyond the horizon. A powerful microwave beam is aimed just above the horizon; as it passes through the tropopause some of the microwaves are scattered back to Earth to a receiver beyond the horizon. Distances of 300 km can be achieved. These are mainly used for military communication.

== Antennas ==
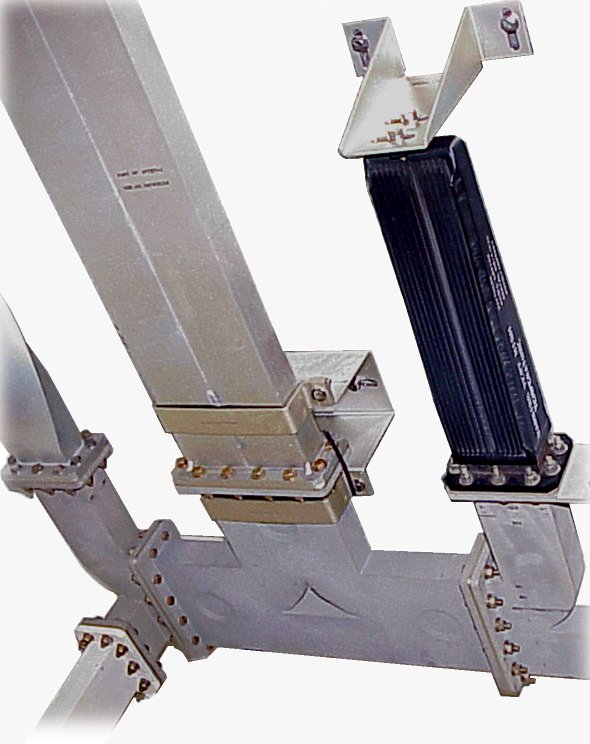
Microwaves are often carried by waveguide, such as this example from an air traffic control radar, since other types of cable have large power losses at SHF frequencies.

The wavelength of SHF waves is short enough that efficient transmitting antennas are small enough to be conveniently mounted on handheld devices, so these frequencies are widely used for wireless applications. For example a quarter wave whip antenna for the SHF band is between 2.5 and 0.25 centimeters long. Omnidirectional antennas have been developed for applications like wireless devices and cellphones that are small enough to be enclosed inside the device's case. The main antenna used for these devices is the printed inverted F antenna (PIFA) consisting of a monopole antenna bent in an L shape, fabricated of copper foil on the printed circuit board inside the device. Small sleeve dipoles or quarter-wave monopoles are also used. The patch antenna is another common type, often integrated into the skin of aircraft.

The wavelengths are also small enough that SHF waves can be focused into narrow beams by high gain directional antennas from a half meter to five meters in diameter. Directive antennas at SHF frequencies are mostly aperture antennas, such as parabolic antennas (the most common type), lens, slot and horn antennas. Large parabolic antennas can produce very narrow beams of a few degrees or less, and often must be aimed with the aid of a boresight. Another type of antenna practical at microwave frequencies is the phased array, consisting of many dipoles or patch antennas on a flat surface, each fed through a phase shifter, which allows the array's beam to be steered electronically. The short wavelength requires great mechanical rigidity in large antennas, to ensure that the radio waves arrive at the feed point in phase.

=== Waveguide ===
At microwave frequencies, the types of cable (transmission line) used to conduct lower frequency radio waves, such as coaxial cable, have high power losses. Therefore, to transport microwaves between the transmitter or receiver and the antenna with low losses, a special type of metal pipe called waveguide must be used. Because of the high cost and maintenance requirements of long waveguide runs, in many microwave antennas the output stage of the transmitter or the RF front end of the receiver is located at the antenna.

== Advantages ==
SHF frequencies occupy a "sweet spot" in the radio spectrum which is currently being exploited by many new radio services. They are the lowest frequency band where radio waves can be directed in narrow beams by conveniently sized antennas so they do not interfere with nearby transmitters on the same frequency, allowing frequency reuse. On the other hand, they are the highest frequencies which can be used for long distance terrestrial communication; higher frequencies in the EHF (millimeter wave) band are highly absorbed by the atmosphere, limiting practical propagation distances to one kilometer or less. The high frequency gives microwave communication links a very large information-carrying capacity (bandwidth). In recent decades many new solid state sources of microwave energy have been developed, and microwave integrated circuits for the first time allow significant signal processing to be done at these frequencies. Sources of EHF energy are much more limited and in an earlier state of development.

== See also ==
- Knife-edge effect
- Microwave burn
