= V band =

Band of frequencies in the microwave portion of the electromagnetic spectrum

IEEE V band
- Frequency range: 40–75 GHz
- Wavelength range: 7.5–4 mm
- Related bands: L / M (NATO); EHF (ITU)

The V band ("vee-band") is a standard designation by the Institute of Electrical and Electronics Engineers (IEEE) for a band of frequencies in the microwave portion of the electromagnetic spectrum ranging from 40 to 75 gigahertz (GHz). The V band is not heavily used, except for millimeter wave radar research and other kinds of scientific research. It should not be confused with the 600–1,000 MHz range of Band V (Band Five) of the UHF frequency range.

The V band is also used for high capacity terrestrial millimeter wave communications systems. In the United States, the Federal Communications Commission has allocated the frequency band from 57 to 71 GHz for unlicensed wireless systems. These systems are primarily used for high capacity, short distance (less than 1 mile or 1.6 km) communications. In addition, frequencies at 70, 80, and 90 GHz have been allocated as "lightly licensed" bands for multi-gigabit wireless communications. All communications links in the V band require unobstructed line of sight between the transmit and receive point, and rain fade must be taken into account when performing link budget analysis.

== Uses ==
On December 15, 1995 the V band at 60 GHz was used by the world's first crosslink communication between satellites in a constellation. This communication was between the U.S. Milstar 1 and Milstar 2 military satellites. 60 GHz is attractive for secure satellite crosslinks because it allows for high data rates, narrow beams and, lying in a strong absorption band of oxygen, provides protection against intercept by ground-based adversaries.

=== Very short range Wi-Fi ===
The WiGig standard IEEE 802.11ad and IEEE 802.11ay utilize the 60 GHz (EHF microwave) spectrum with data transfer rates of up to 7 Gbit/s for very short ranges of up to 10 metres (33 ft)

=== Wireless broadband ===
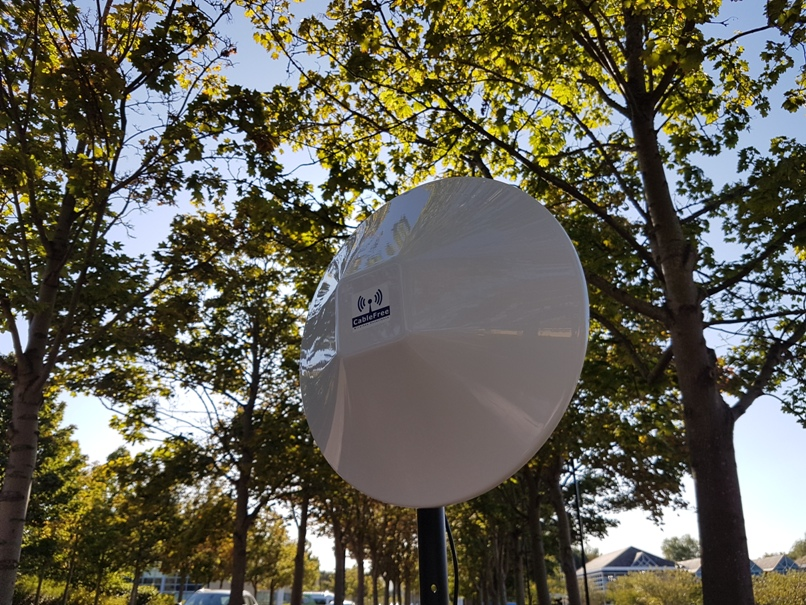
CableFree V-band high-gain radio for wireless broadband applications

Internet service providers are looking for ways to expand gigabit high-speed services to their customers. These can be achieved through fiber to the premises broadband network architecture, or a more affordable alternative using fixed wireless in the last mile in combination with the fiber networks in the middle mile in order to reduce the costs of trenching fiber optic cables to the users. In the United States and several other countries, V band is unlicensed. This makes V band an appealing choice to be used as fixed wireless access for gigabit services to connect to homes and businesses. V-band radios are available in both Point to Point (P2P) and Point to Multipoint (P2MP) configurations.

=== Satellite constellations ===
As of March 2017, several US, UK and Canadian companies—Boeing, SpaceX, OneWeb, Telesat, O3b Networks and Theia Holdings—have each filed with the US regulatory authorities (FCC) "plans to field constellations of V-band satellites in non-geosynchronous orbits to provide communications services", an electromagnetic spectrum that had not previously been "heavily employed for commercial communications services".

In 2020, SpaceX was granted permission by the FCC to launch 12,000 satellites that are able to use these frequencies.

In September 2022, Boeing launched a V-band technology demonstrator satellite known as Varuna as a rideshare payload. In November 2021, Boeing had obtained a FCC license to operate a 147-satellite V-band constellation, however in October 2023 Boeing had the license cancelled following a strategic business decision not to proceed with the constellation.
