= Radio frequency =

Electromagnetic frequencies ranging from 9 kHz to 300 GHz

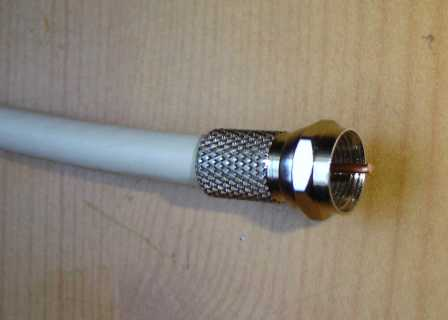
Radio-frequency electrical currents are usually carried by specially-designed transmission line such as coaxial cable, as ordinary electrical cables would have high power loss

Radio frequency (RF) is the oscillation rate of an alternating electric current or voltage or of a magnetic, electric or electromagnetic field or mechanical system in the frequency range from around 9 kHz to around 300 GHz. These are the frequencies at which energy from an oscillating current can radiate off a conductor into space as radio waves, so they are used in radio technology, among other uses. Different sources specify different upper and lower bounds for the frequency range.

== Electric current ==
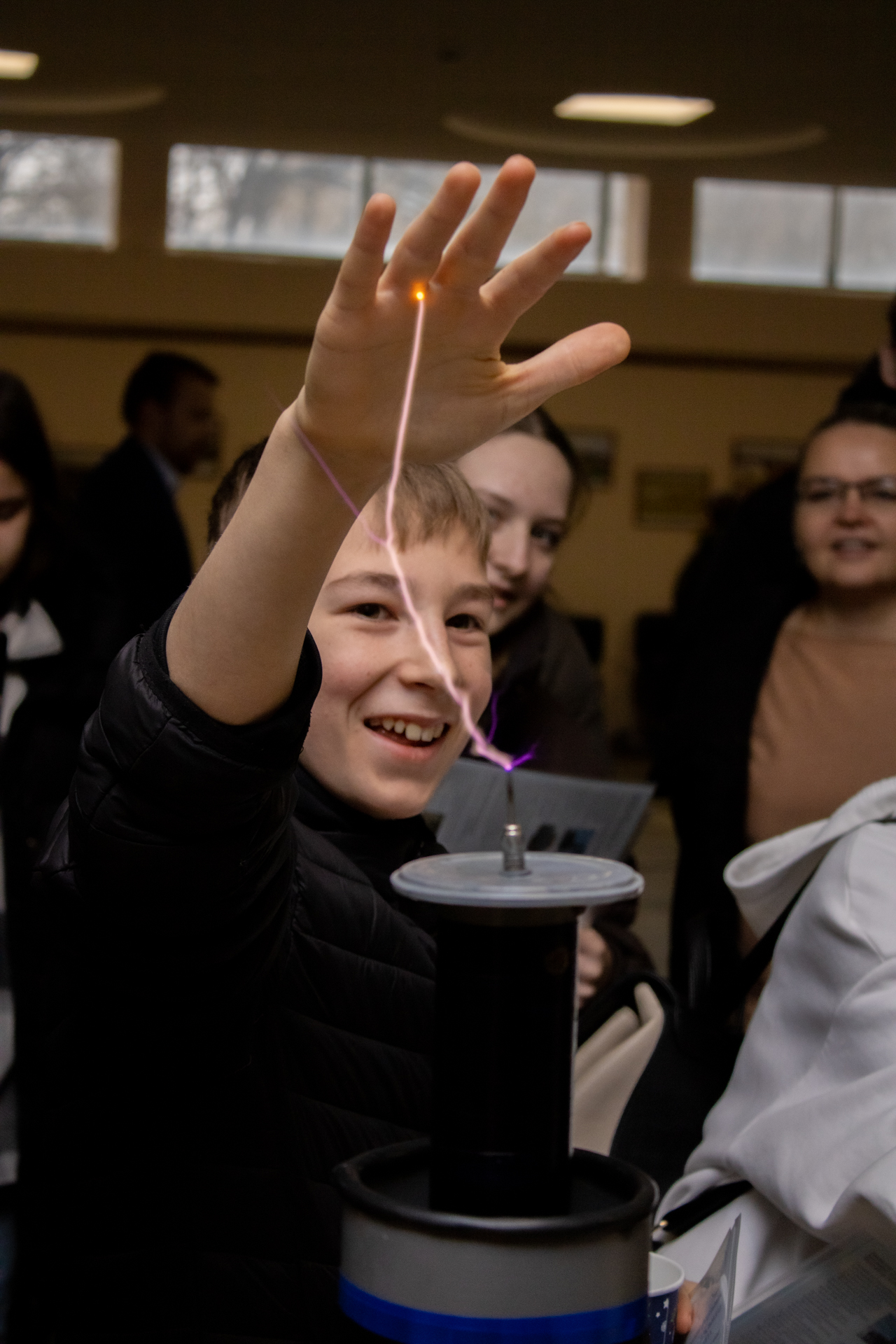
Boy allowing the arc from a Tesla coil to strike his hand. Coming in contact with radio frequency arcs as shown here is extremely dangerous and can result in electrocution

Electric currents that oscillate at radio frequencies (RF currents) have special properties not shared by direct current or lower alternating current, such as the 50 or 60 Hz current used in electrical power distribution.

- Energy from RF currents in conductors can radiate into space as electromagnetic waves (radio waves). This is the basis of radio technology.
- RF current does not penetrate deeply into electrical conductors but tends to flow along their surfaces; this is known as the skin effect.
- RF currents applied to the body often do not cause the painful sensation and muscular contraction of electric shock that lower frequency currents produce. This is because the current changes direction too quickly to trigger depolarization of nerve membranes. However, this does not mean RF currents are harmless; they can cause internal injury as well as serious superficial burns called RF burns.
- RF current can ionize air, creating a conductive path through it. This property is exploited by "high frequency" units used in electric arc welding, which use currents at higher frequencies than power distribution uses.
- Another property is the ability to appear to flow through paths that contain insulating material, like the dielectric insulator of a capacitor. This is because capacitive reactance in a circuit decreases with increasing frequency.
- In contrast, RF current can be blocked by a coil of wire, or even a single turn or bend in a wire. This is because the inductive reactance of a circuit increases with increasing frequency.
- When conducted by an ordinary electric cable, RF current has a tendency to reflect from discontinuities in the cable, such as connectors, and travel back down the cable toward the source, causing a condition called standing waves. RF current may be carried efficiently over transmission lines such as coaxial cables.

== Frequency bands ==
The radio spectrum of frequencies is divided into bands with conventional names designated by the International Telecommunication Union (ITU):

Frequency range	Wavelength range	ITU designation		IEEE bands
Frequency range	Wavelength range	Full name	Abbreviation	IEEE bands
Below 3 Hz	>10⁵ km			—N/a
3–30 Hz	10⁵–10⁴ km	Extremely low frequency	ELF	—N/a
30–300 Hz	10⁴–10³ km	Super low frequency	SLF	—N/a
300–3000 Hz	10³–100 km	Ultra low frequency	ULF	—N/a
3–30 kHz	100–10 km	Very low frequency	VLF	—N/a
30–300 kHz	10–1 km	Low frequency	LF	—N/a
300 kHz – 3 MHz	1 km – 100 m	Medium frequency	MF	—N/a
3–30 MHz	100–10 m	High frequency	HF	HF
30–300 MHz	10–1 m	Very high frequency	VHF	VHF
300 MHz – 3 GHz	1 m – 100 mm	Ultra high frequency	UHF	UHF, L, S
3–30 GHz	100–10 mm	Super high frequency	SHF	S, C, X, Ku, K, Ka
30–300 GHz	10–1 mm	Extremely high frequency	EHF	Ka, V, W, mm
300 GHz – 3 THz	1 mm – 0.1 mm	Tremendously high frequency	THF	—N/a
Radio Spectrum Allocations in Canada	International Telecommunication Union ITU			

Frequencies of 1 GHz and above are conventionally called microwave, while frequencies of 30 GHz and above are designated millimeter wave. More detailed band designations are given by the standard IEEE letter- band frequency designations and the EU/NATO frequency designations.

== Applications ==
Radio has many practical applications, which include broadcasting, voice communication, data communication, radar, radiolocation, medical treatments, and remote control.

== Measurement ==
Test apparatus for radio frequencies can include standard instruments at the lower end of the range, but at higher frequencies, the test equipment becomes more specialized.

Radio-frequency signal generators are commonly used as sources in RF testing and calibration setups, providing controlled oscillating signals over wide frequency ranges. In addition to commercial instrumentation, several manufacturers and engineering organizations publish technical documentation and design guides describing practical implementations of RF generators and high-frequency power systems.

== Mechanical oscillations ==
While RF usually refers to electrical oscillations, mechanical RF systems are not uncommon: see mechanical filter and RF MEMS.

== See also ==
- Amplitude modulation (AM)
- Bandwidth (signal processing)
- Electromagnetic interference
- Electromagnetic radiation
- Electromagnetic spectrum
- EMF measurement
- Frequency allocation
- Frequency modulation (FM)
- Plastic welding
- Pulsed electromagnetic field therapy
- Radio astronomy
- Spectrum management
- Waveguide (radio frequency)
