= X band =

Microwave radio frequency band from 8–12 GHz

IEEE X band
- Frequency range: 8.0–12.0 GHz
- Wavelength range: 3.75–2.5 cm
- Related bands: I / J bands (NATO); SHF (ITU)

The X band is the designation for a band of frequencies in the microwave radio region of the electromagnetic spectrum. In some cases, such as in communication engineering, the frequency range of the X band is set at approximately 7.0–11.2 GHz. In radar engineering, the frequency range is specified by the Institute of Electrical and Electronics Engineers (IEEE) as 8.0–12.0 GHz. The X band is used for radar, satellite communication, and wireless computer networks.

== Radar ==
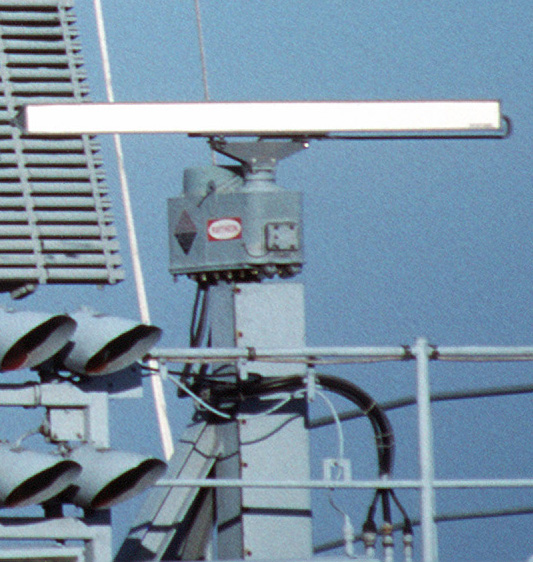
An X-band marine radar antenna on a ship

X band is used in radar applications, including continuous-wave, pulsed, single-polarization, dual-polarization, synthetic aperture radar, and phased arrays. X-band radar frequency sub-bands are used in civil, military, and government institutions for weather monitoring, air traffic control, maritime vessel traffic control, defense tracking, and vehicle speed detection for law enforcement.

X band is often used in modern radars. The shorter wavelengths of the X band provide higher-resolution imagery from high-resolution imaging radars for target identification and discrimination. X-band weather radars offer significant potential for short-range observations, but the loss of signal strength (attenuation) under rainy conditions limits their use at longer range.

=== Terrestrial communications and networking ===
The X band 10.15 to 10.7 GHz segment is used for terrestrial broadband in many countries, such as Brazil, Mexico, Saudi Arabia, Denmark, Ukraine, Spain and Ireland. Alvarion, CBNL, CableFree and Ogier make systems for this, though each has a proprietary airlink. DOCSIS (Data Over Cable Service Interface Specification) the standard used for providing cable internet to customers, uses some X band frequencies. The home / business customer-premises equipment (CPE) has a single coaxial cable with a power adapter connecting to an ordinary cable modem. The local oscillator is usually 9750 MHz, the same as for K_{u} band satellite TV LNB. Two way applications such as broadband typically use a 350 MHz TX offset.

=== Space communications for science and research ===
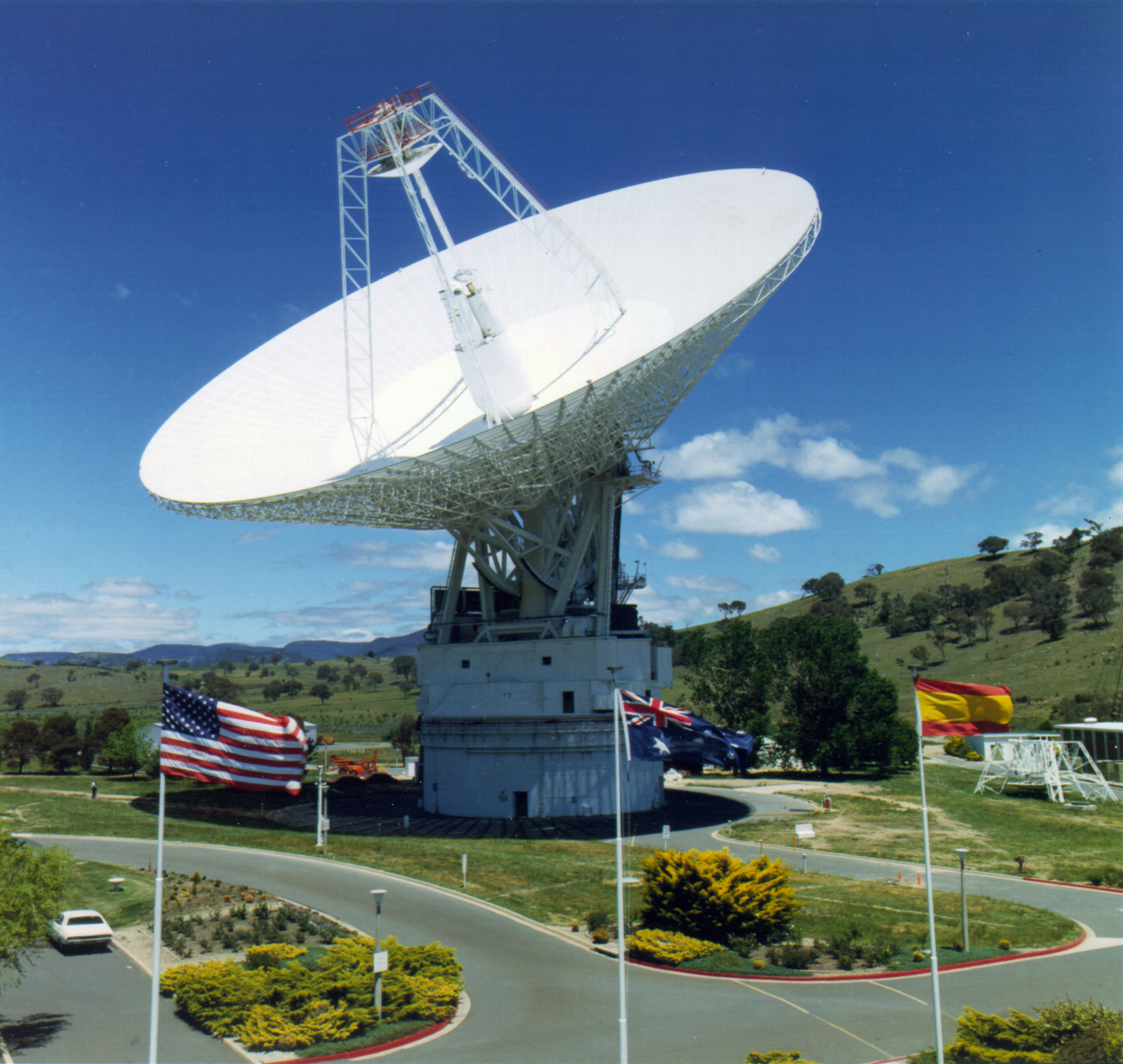
DSS-43 70 meter X-band spacecraft communication antenna at the Canberra Deep Space Communication Complex, Australia.

Small portions of the X band are assigned by the International Telecommunication Union (ITU) exclusively for deep space telecommunications. The primary user of this allocation is the American NASA Deep Space Network (DSN). DSN facilities are in Goldstone, California (in the Mojave Desert), near Canberra, Australia, and near Madrid, Spain, and provide continual communications from the Earth to almost any point in the Solar System independent of Earth rotation. (DSN stations are also capable of using the older and lower S band deep-space radio communications allocations, and some higher frequencies on a more-or-less experimental basis, such as in the K band.)

Notable deep space probe programs that have employed X band communications include the Viking Mars landers; the Voyager missions to Jupiter, Saturn, and beyond; the Galileo Jupiter orbiter; the New Horizons mission to Pluto and the Kuiper belt, the Curiosity rover and the Cassini-Huygens Saturn orbiter.

An important use of the X band communications came with the two Viking program landers. When the planet Mars was passing near or behind the Sun, as seen from the Earth, a Viking lander would transmit two simultaneous continuous-wave carriers, one in the S band and one in the X band in the direction of the Earth, where they were picked up by DSN ground stations. By making simultaneous measurements at the two different frequencies, the resulting data enabled theoretical physicists to verify the mathematical predictions of Albert Einstein's General Theory of Relativity. These results are some of the best confirmations of the General Theory of Relativity.

The new European double Mars Mission ExoMars will also use X band communication, on the instrument LaRa, to study the internal structure of Mars, and to make precise measurements of the rotation and orientation of Mars by monitoring two-way Doppler frequency shifts between the surface platform and Earth. It will also detect variations in angular momentum due to the redistribution of masses, such as the migration of ice from the polar caps to the atmosphere.

=== X band NATO frequency requirements ===
The International Telecommunication Union (ITU), the international body which allocates radio frequencies for civilian use, is not authorised to allocate frequency bands for military radio communication. This is also the case pertaining to X band military communications satellites. However, in order to meet military radio spectrum requirements, e.g. for fixed-satellite service and mobile-satellite service, the NATO nations negotiated the NATO Joint Civil/Military Frequency Agreement (NJFA).

(a)	(b)	(c)	(d)
7250-7750; MHz	FIXED; FIXED-SATELLlTE (s-E), MOBILE-SATELLlTE (s-E) (S5.461)	1. Essential military requirements for satellite downlinks; the mobile satellite sub-band 7250-7300 MHz is for naval and land mobile earth stations.; 2. Military requirement for fixed systems in some countries.	1. This is a harmonised NATO band type 1for satellite downlinks.; 2. 7250-7300 MHz is paired with 7975-8025 MHz for the MOBILE-SATELLlTE allocation.; 3. The FIXED and MOBILE services are not to be implemented in the band 7250-7300 MHz in most NATO countries, including ITU Region 2.; 4. In the band 7300-7750 MHz the transportable earth stations cannot claim protection from the other services.
7750-7900; MHz	FIXED	Military requirements for existing NATO fixed systems in some countries.	
7900-8400; MHz	FIXED-SATELLlTE (E-s), MOBILE-SATELLlTE (E-s) (S5.461), FIXED; Earth exploration-satellite (s-E) (S5.462A),	1. Essential military requirements for satellite uplinks; the mobile satellite sub-band 7975-8025 MHz is for naval and land mobile satellite earth stations.; 2. Military requirement for earth exploration satellite (downlink) purposes in the band 8025-8400 MHz.; 3. Military requirement for fixed systems in some countries.	1. This is a harmonised NATO band type 1 for satellite uplinks.; 2. 7975-8025 MHz is paired with 7250-7300 MHz for the MOBILE-SATELLlTE allocation.; 3. The FIXED and MOBILE services are not to be implemented in 7975-8025 MHz in most NATO countries, including ITU Region 2.; 4. In the bands 7900-7975 and 8025-8400 MHz the transportable earth stations must not cause harmful interference to other services.
8500 MHz- 10.5 GHz	RADIOLOCATION; Radiolocation	Military requirement for land, airborne and naval radars.	Harmonised NATO band type 2 in selected sub-bands is desirable.

== Amateur radio ==
The Radio Regulations of the International Telecommunication Union allow amateur radio operations in the frequency range 10.000 to 10.500 GHz, and amateur satellite operations are allowed in the range 10.450 to 10.500 GHz. This is known as the 3-centimeter band by amateurs and the X-band by AMSAT.

== Other uses ==
Motion detectors often use 10.525 GHz. 10.4 GHz is proposed for traffic light crossing detectors. Comreg in Ireland has allocated 10.450 GHz for traffic sensors as SRD.

Many electron paramagnetic resonance (EPR) spectrometers operate near 9.8 GHz.

Particle accelerators may be powered by X-band RF sources. The frequencies are then standardized at 11.9942 GHz (Europe) or 11.424 GHz (US), which is the second harmonic of C-band and fourth harmonic of S-band. The European X-band frequency is used for the Compact Linear Collider (CLIC).

Many Radio Astronomy facilities have receivers which work in the X-band including the Green Bank Telescope and the Very Large Array. Radio Astronomy has a Frequency Allocation for (quiet) bands at 10.6-10.68 GHz, and 10.68-10.7 GHz, but the receivers work across a much wider range of the entire X-band (e.g. 7-12 GHz) trying to take advantages of as much bandwidth as possible to be sensitive to faint astronomical sources.

== See also ==
- Cassegrain reflector
- Directional antenna
- XTAR
- Sea-based X band Radar
- New Horizons telecommunications
- Voyager program#Spacecraft design
- Earth observation satellites transmission frequencies
- TerraSAR-X: a German Earth observation satellite
