= NATO Joint Civil/Military Frequency Agreement =

The NATO Joint Civil/Military Frequency Agreement (NJFA) is the universal NATO common civil/military treaty to regulate the military access to the radio frequency spectrum in the range of 14 kHz to 100 GHz in peacetime, during exercises, in times of crisis, and in military operations. This document has been the basis for the frequency utilisation in NATO-Europe since 1982. Nations and organisations, e.g. partnership for peace countries, are invited to participate as deemed to be necessary.

The national representatives of the frequency sovereignty agree unanimous to changes of the NJFA, in line to decisions of World Radiocommunication Conferences, operational requirement of the armed forces, and technical developments. However, the provision of "Article 38 of the International Telecommunication Convention, Nairobi 1982" remains untouched.

== Particularities ==
- The military use of the frequency spectrum is based on the provisions of the ITU Radio Regulations and the ITU Constitution (Article 48 and RR N.342).
- A supplement to the NJFA for states of emergency, and times of crisis and war, on the use of radio spectrum for military purposes required by NATO forces or in support of NATO, caters for additional spectrum.

== See also ==
- X band NATO frequency requirements
