= Ka band =

Portion of the microwave part of the electromagnetic spectrum (26.5–40 gigahertz)

IEEE K_{a} band
- Frequency range: 27–40 GHz
- Wavelength range: 11.1–7.5 mm
- Related bands: K (NATO); SHF (ITU)

The K_{a} band (pronounced as either "kay-ay band" or "ka band") is a portion of the microwave part of the electromagnetic spectrum. The designation "K_{a} band" is from Kurz-above, which stems from the German word kurz, meaning "short".

A Ka band metasurface antenna at 9th Bengaluru Space Expo 2026, BIEC

There is no standard definition of the K_{a} band. IEEE Standard letter designations for Radar Bands define the nominal frequency range for the K_{a} band in the range 27–40 gigahertz (GHz) in Tables 1 and 2 of IEEE Standard 521 i.e. wavelengths from slightly over one centimeter down to 7.5 millimeters. The ITU however approves K_{a} band satellite networks in the 17.3-31 GHz frequency range, with most K_{a} band satellite networks having uplinks in the 27.5–31 GHz and downlinks in the 17.7–21.2 GHz range.

The band is called K_{a}, short for "K-above" because it is the upper part of the original (now obsolete) NATO K band, which was split into three bands because of the presence of the atmospheric water vapour resonance peak at 22.24 GHz (1.35 cm), which made the centre unusable for long range transmission. The 30/20 GHz band is used in communications satellite uplinks in either the 27.5 GHz or 31 GHz bands, and in high-resolution, close-range targeting radars aboard military aeroplanes. Some frequencies in this radio band are used for vehicle speed detection by law enforcement. The Kepler Mission used this frequency range to downlink the scientific data collected by the space telescope. This frequency is also used for remote sensing of clouds by radar, by both ground-based or satellite systems such as INCUS.

In satellite communications, the K_{a} band allows higher bandwidth communication. It was first used in the experimental ACTS Gigabit Satellite Network, and is currently used for high-throughput satellite Internet access in geostationary orbit (GEO) by the Inmarsat I-5 system, Kacific K-1 satellite, the ViaSat 1, 2, and 3 satellites among others; in low Earth orbit (LEO) by the SpaceX Starlink system and the Iridium Next satellite series; it is also used in medium Earth orbit (MEO) by the SES O3b system; and the James Webb Space Telescope.

Planned future satellite projects using the K_{a} band include Amazon Leo (formerly "Project Kuiper") satellite internet constellation in LEO, SES's multi-orbit satellite internet system of the SES-17 satellite in GEO (launched in October 2021; in position and fully operational in June 2022) and the O3b mPOWER constellation in MEO (first two, of 13 satellites, launched December 2022 and service started in April 2024).

The K_{a} band is more susceptible to rain attenuation than is the K_{u} band, which in turn is more susceptible than the C band. The frequency is commonly used by cosmic microwave background experiments. 5th generation mobile networks will also partially overlap with the K_{a} band (28, 38, and 60 GHz).

== See also ==
- Saorsat, Ireland satellite television on Ka band
