= Coast earth station =

Communications facility

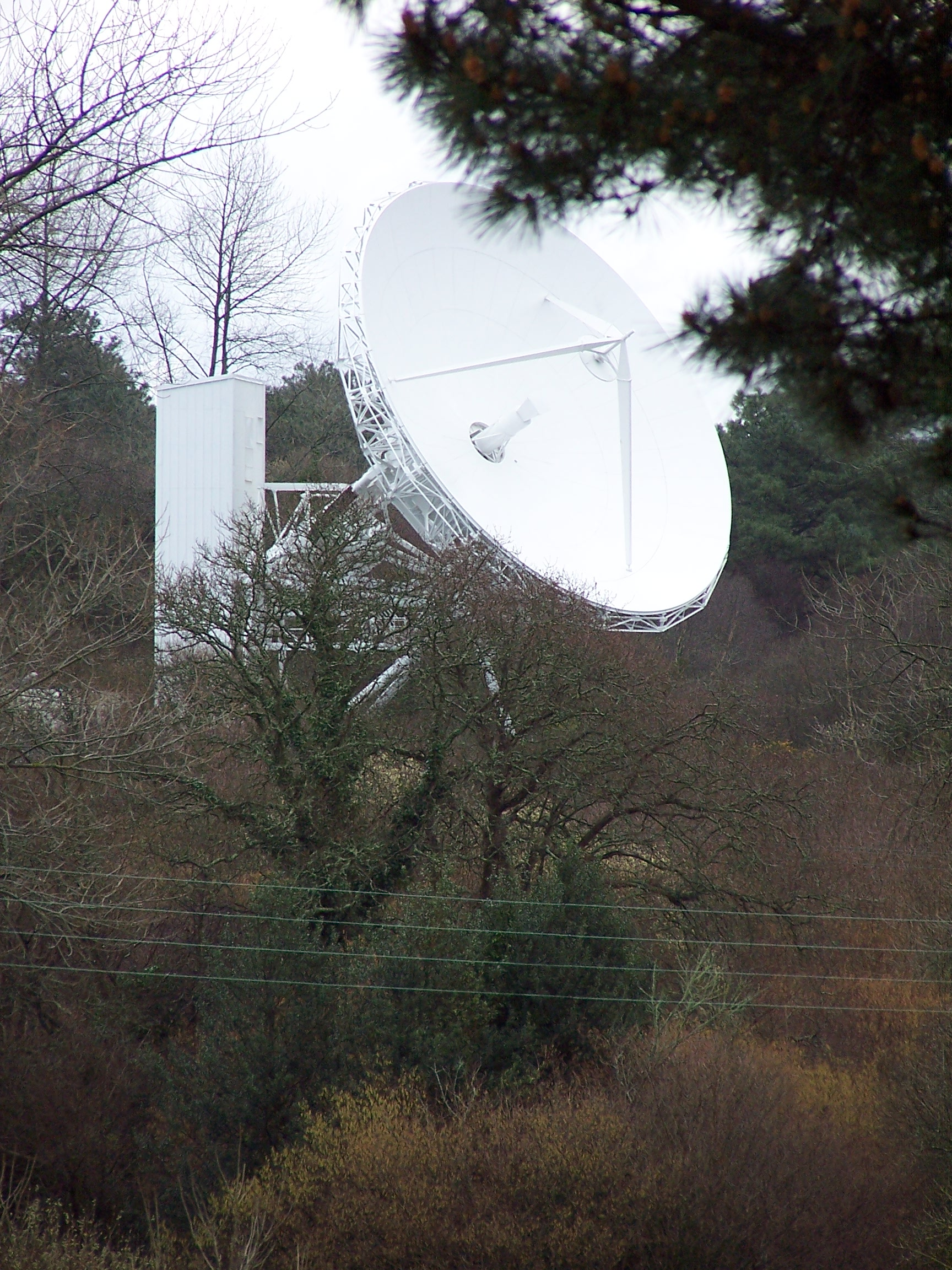
Coast earth station Inmarsat, here: aerial PB5, France

Coast earth station, also called the coast earth radio station is – according to article 1.76 of the International Telecommunication Union's (ITU) ITU Radio Regulations (RR) – defined as "An earth station in the fixed-satellite service or, in some cases, in the maritime mobile-satellite service, located at a specified fixed point on land to provide a feeder link for the maritime mobile-satellite service." Each radio station shall be classified by the service in which it operates permanently or temporarily.

== Classification ==
In accordance with ITU Radio Regulations (article 1) this type of radio station might be classified as follows:
Earth station (article 1.63)

- Mobile earth station (article 1.68) of the mobile-satellite service (article 1.25)
- Land earth station (article 1.70) of the fixed-satellite service (article 1.21) or mobile-satellite service
  - Land mobile earth station (article 1.74) of the land mobile-satellite service (article 1.27)
- Base earth station (article 1.72) of the fixed-satellite service
- Coast earth station
- Ship earth station (article 1.78) of the mobile-satellite service
- Aeronautical earth station (article 1.82) of the fixed-satellite service / aeronautical mobile-satellite service (article 1.35)
- Aircraft earth station (article 1.84) of the aeronautical mobile-satellite service
