= Ship earth station =

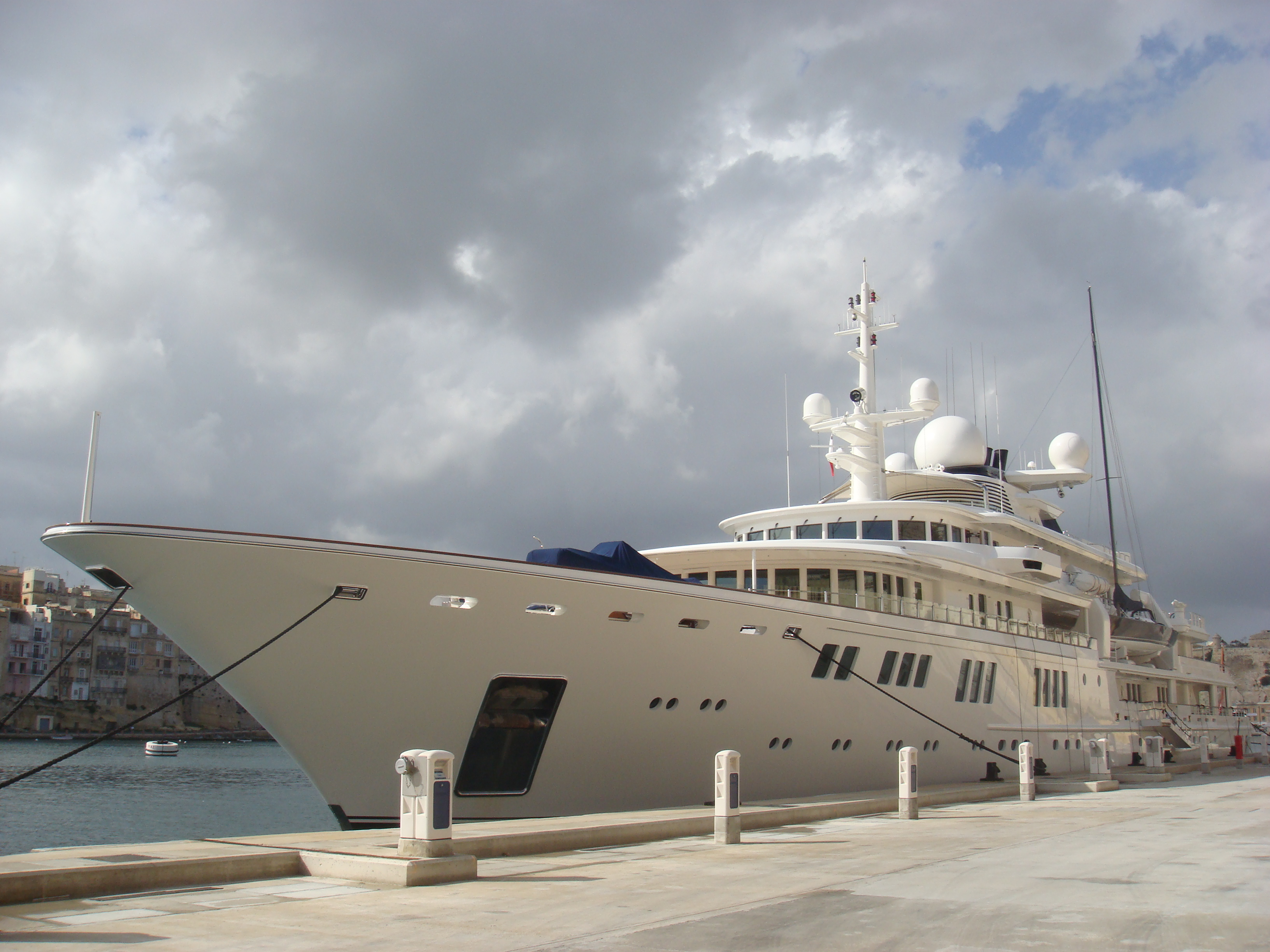
Ship earth station aerials on board high-seas yacht

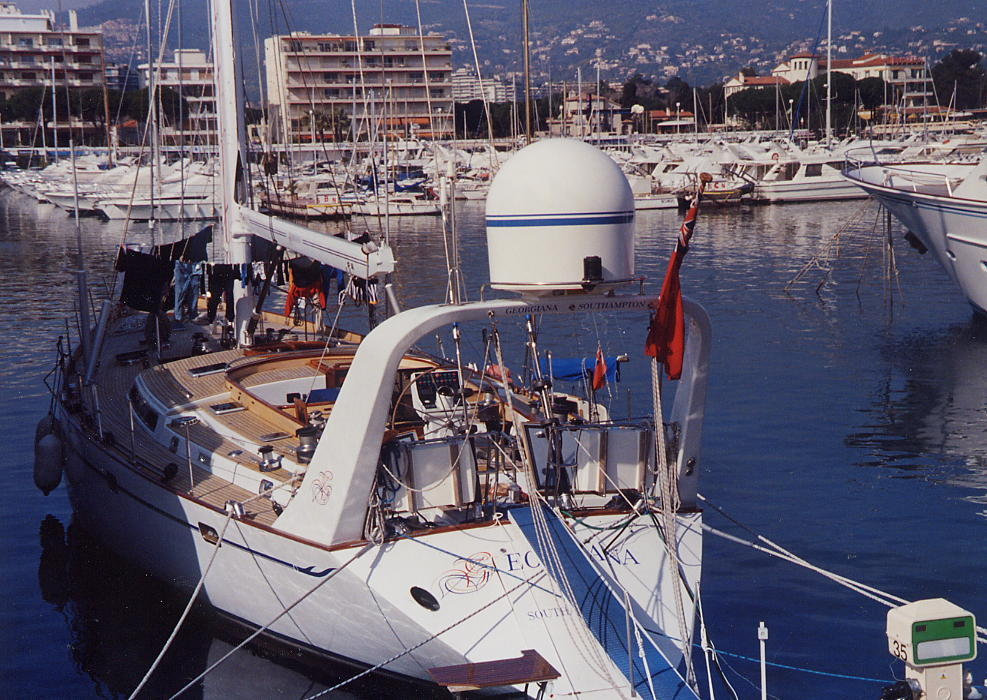
Inmarsat ship earth station on poop of a yacht

Ship earth station (also: ship earth radio station) is – according to Article 1.78 of the International Telecommunication Union's (ITU) ITU Radio Regulations (RR) – defined as "A mobile earth station in the maritime mobile-satellite service located on board ship."

The ITU regulation requires that each radio station be classified according to the service in which it operates permanently or temporarily.

Ship earth stations can provide a variety of radiocommunication services including crew calling.

== Classification ==
In accordance with ITU Radio Regulations (article 1) this type of radio station might be classified as follows:
Earth station (article 1.63)

- Mobile earth station (article 1.68) of the mobile-satellite service (article 1.25)
- Land earth station (article 1.70) of the fixed-satellite service (article 1.21) or mobile-satellite service
  - Land mobile earth station (article 1.74) of the land mobile-satellite service (article 1.27)
- Base earth station (article 1.72) of the fixed-satellite service
- Coast earth station (article 1.76) of the fixed-satellite service / mobile-satellite service
- Ship earth station
- Aeronautical earth station (article 1.82) of the fixed-satellite service / aeronautical mobile-satellite service (article 1.35)
- Aircraft earth station (article 1.84) of the aeronautical mobile-satellite service

== References / sources ==
- International Telecommunication Union (ITU)
