= Aircraft earth station =

Mobile earth station aboard an aircraft

Aeronautical earth station (1.82 left), Aircraft earth station (right)

Aircraft earth station (also: aircraft earth radio station) is – according to Article 1.84 of the International Telecommunication Union's (ITU) ITU Radio Regulations (RR) – defined as "A mobile earth station in the aeronautical mobile-satellite service located on board an aircraft."

Each station shall be classified by the service in which it operates permanently or temporarily.

== Classification ==
In accordance with ITU Radio Regulations (article 1) this type of radio station might be classified as follows:
Earth station (article 1.63)

- Mobile earth station (article 1.68) of the mobile-satellite service (article 1.25)
- Land earth station (article 1.70) of the fixed-satellite service (article 1.21) or mobile-satellite service
  - Land mobile earth station (article 1.74) of the land mobile-satellite service (article 1.27)
- Base earth station (article 1.72) of the fixed-satellite service
- Coast earth station (article 1.76) of the fixed-satellite service / mobile-satellite service
- Ship earth station (article 1.78) of the mobile-satellite service
- Aeronautical earth station (article 1.82) of the fixed-satellite service / aeronautical mobile-satellite service (article 1.35)
- Aircraft earth station

== References / sources ==
- International Telecommunication Union (ITU)
