= Land mobile earth station =

Type of radio station

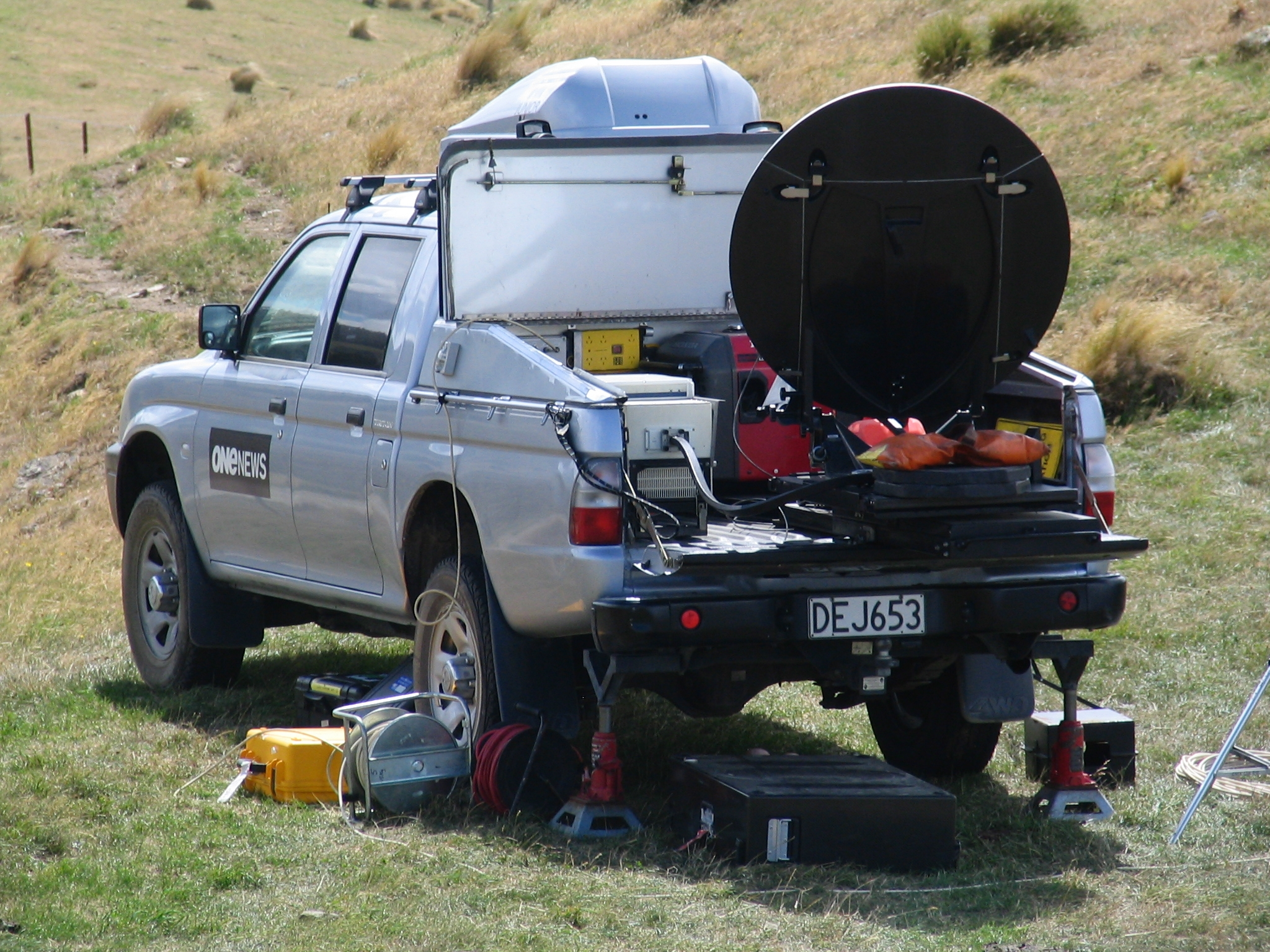
Land mobile earth station of the land mobile-satellite service, to send news via satellite link used by TVNZ reporters

Land mobile earth station (also: land mobile earth radio station) is – according to Article 1.74 of the International Telecommunication Union's (ITU) ITU Radio Regulations (RR) – defined as "A mobile earth station in the land mobile-satellite service capable of surface movement within the geographical limits of a country or continent."

See also

== Classification ==
In accordance with ITU Radio Regulations (article 1) this type of radio station might be classified as follows:
Earth station (article 1.63)

- Mobile earth station (article 1.68) of the mobile-satellite service (article 1.25)
- Land earth station (article 1.70) of the fixed-satellite service (article 1.21) or mobile-satellite service
  - Land mobile earth station
- Base earth station (article 1.72) of the fixed-satellite service
- Coast earth station (article 1.76) of the fixed-satellite service / mobile-satellite service
- Ship earth station (article 1.78) of the mobile-satellite service
- Aeronautical earth station (article 1.82) of the fixed-satellite service / aeronautical mobile-satellite service (article 1.35)
- Aircraft earth station (article 1.84) of the aeronautical mobile-satellite service

== References / sources ==
- International Telecommunication Union (ITU)
