= Mobile earth station =

Concept in radio communication

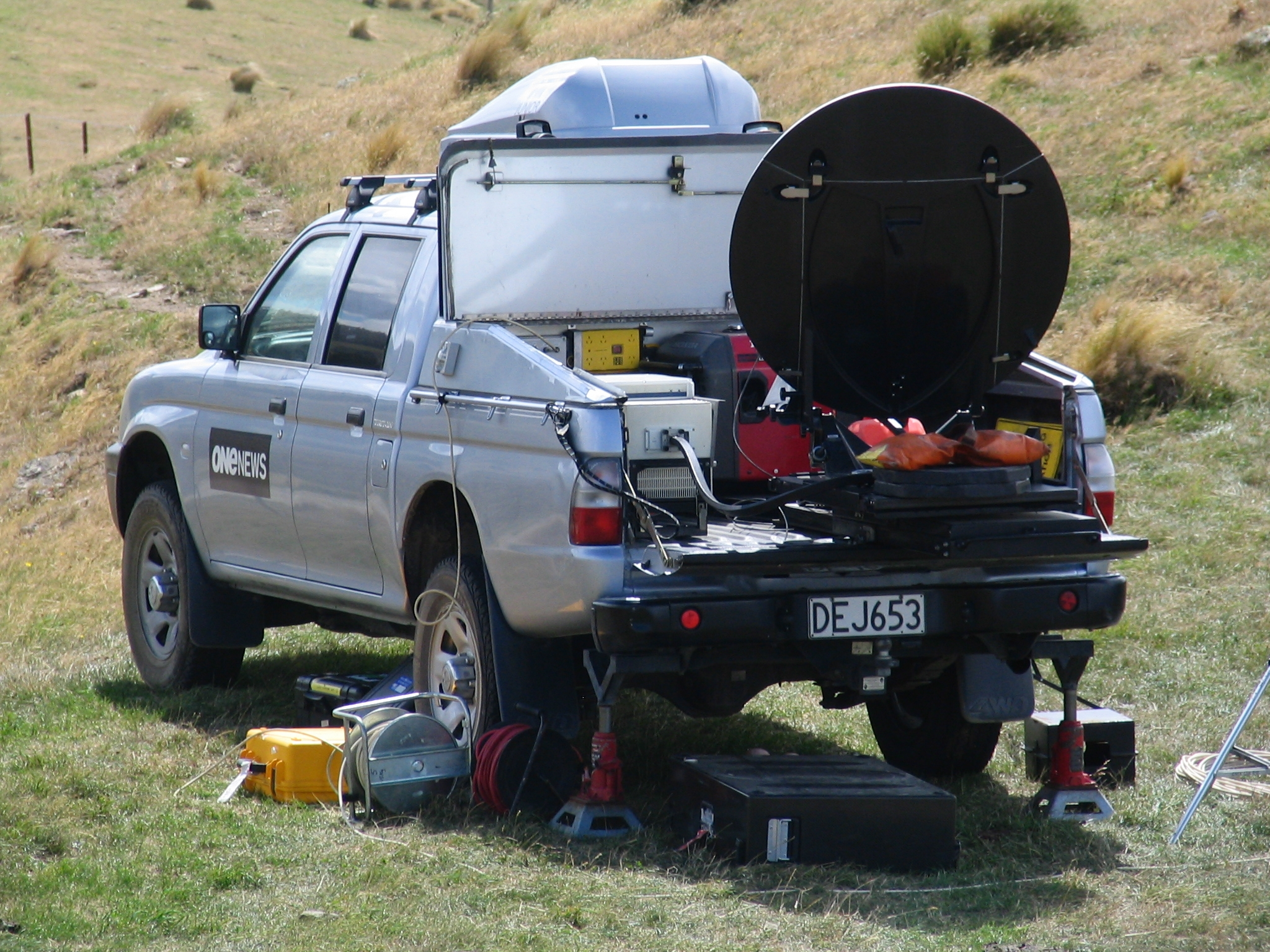
Land mobile earth station of the land mobile-satellite service, to send news via satellite link used by TVNZ reporters

Mobile earth station (MES; also: mobile earth radio station) is – according to Article 1.68 of the International Telecommunication Union's (ITU) ITU Radio Regulations (RR) – defined as "An earth station in the mobile-satellite service intended to be used while in motion or during halts at unspecified points."

Each station shall be classified by the service in which it operates permanently or temporarily.

See also

== Classification ==
In accordance with ITU Radio Regulations (article 1) this type of radio station might be classified as follows:
Earth station (article 1.63)

- Mobile earth station
- Land earth station (article 1.70) of the fixed-satellite service (article 1.21) or mobile-satellite service
  - Land mobile earth station (article 1.74) of the land mobile-satellite service (article 1.27)
- Base earth station (article 1.72) of the fixed-satellite service
- Coast earth station (article 1.76) of the fixed-satellite service / mobile-satellite service
- Ship earth station (article 1.78) of the mobile-satellite service
- Aeronautical earth station (article 1.82) of the fixed-satellite service / mobile-satellite service
- Aircraft earth station (article 1.84) of the aeronautical mobile-satellite service (article 1.32)
