= Satellite emergency position-indicating radiobeacon station =

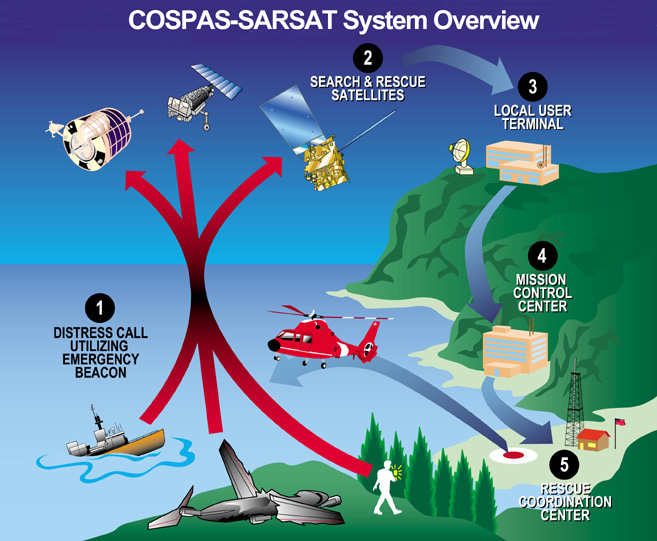
COSPAS-SARSAT satellite emergency position-indicating radiobeacon station

Satellite emergency position-indicating radiobeacon station (sort: SEPIRS) is – according to article 1.94 of the International Telecommunication Union's (ITU) ITU Radio Regulations (RR) – defined as "An earth station in the mobile-satellite service the emissions of which are intended to facilitate search and rescue (SAR) operations."

Each radio station shall be classified by the radiocommunication service in which it operates permanently or temporarily.

== See also ==
- Emergency position-indicating radiobeacon station
- Radio station
- Radiocommunication service

== References / sources ==
- International Telecommunication Union (ITU)
