= Space operation service =

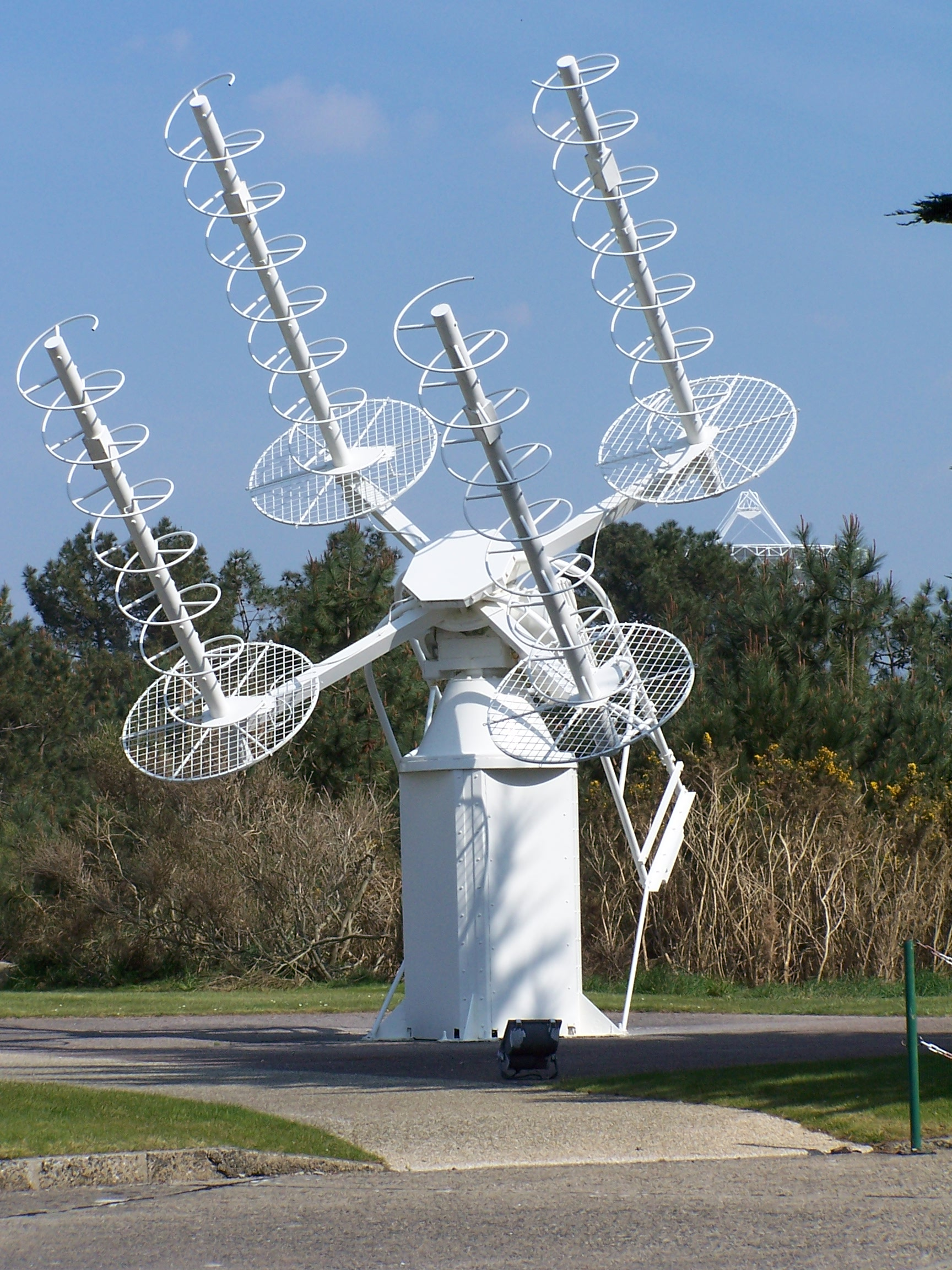
Array of four axial-mode helical antennas used for satellite tracking, France

Space operation service (short: SOS; also: space operation radiocommunication service) is – according to Article 1.23 of the International Telecommunication Union's (ITU) Radio Regulations (RR) – defined as A radiocommunication service concerned exclusively with the operation of spacecraft, in particular space tracking, space telemetry and space telecommand. These functions will normally be provided within the service in which the space station is operating.

== Frequency allocation ==
The allocation of radio frequencies is provided according to Article 5 of the ITU Radio Regulations (edition 2012).

In order to improve harmonisation in spectrum utilisation, the majority of service-allocations stipulated in this document were incorporated in national Tables of Frequency Allocations and Utilisations which is with-in the responsibility of the appropriate national administration. The allocation might be primary, secondary, exclusive, and shared.

- primary allocation: is indicated by writing in capital letters (see example below)
- secondary allocation: is indicated by small letters
- exclusive or shared utilization: is within the responsibility of administrations

Example of frequency allocation

Allocation to services
Region 1	Region 2	Region 3
30.005–30.010 MHz SPACE OPERATION (satellite identification); FIXED; MOBILE; SPACE RESEARCH

== See also ==
- Radio station
- Radiocommunication service

== References / sources ==
- International Telecommunication Union (ITU)
