= Maritime mobile-satellite service =

MMSS Inmarsat-3 satellite locations

Maritime mobile-satellite service (MMSS, or maritime mobile-satellite radiocommunication service) is – according to Article 1.29 of the International Telecommunication Union's Radio Regulations (RR) – "A mobile-satellite service in which mobile earth stations are located on board ships; survival craft stations and emergency position-indicating radiobeacon stations may also participate in this service", in addition to serving as navigation systems.

== Classification ==
This radiocommunication service is classified in accordance with ITU Radio Regulations (article 1) as follows:
Mobile service

- Maritime mobile service (article 1.28)
  - Maritime mobile-satellite service
  - Port operations service (article 1.30)
  - Ship movement service (article 1.31)

== Frequency allocation ==
The allocation of radio frequencies is provided according to Article 5 of the ITU Radio Regulations (edition 2012).

In order to improve harmonisation in spectrum utilisation, the majority of service-allocations stipulated in this document were incorporated in national Tables of Frequency Allocations and Utilisations which is with-in the responsibility of the appropriate national administration. The allocation might be primary, secondary, exclusive, and shared.

- primary allocation: is indicated by writing in capital letters
- secondary allocation: is indicated by small letters
- exclusive or shared utilization: is within the responsibility of administrations

Example of frequency allocation

Allocation to services
Region 1	Region 2	Region 3
137–137.025 SPACE OPERATION (space-to-Earth); METEOROLOGICAL-SATELLITE (space-to-Earth); MOBILE-SATELLITE (space-to-Earth); SPACE RESEARCH (space-to-Earth); Fixed; Mobile except aeronautical mobile (R)

Selection of MMSS stations

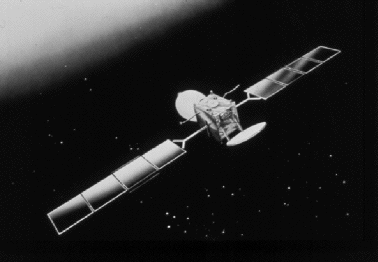
Space radio station, Inmarsat-3 satellite

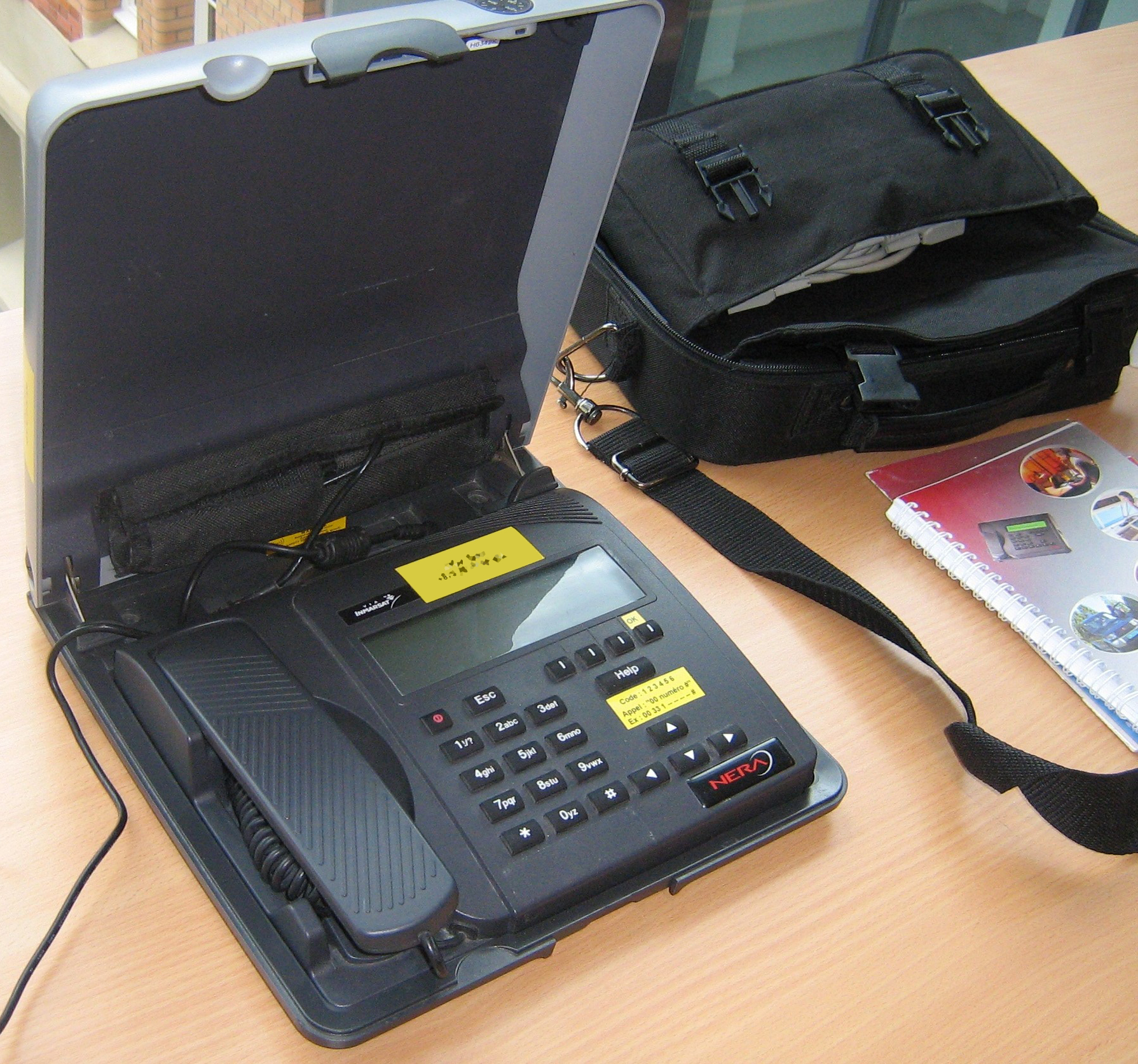
Earth station, telephone terminal

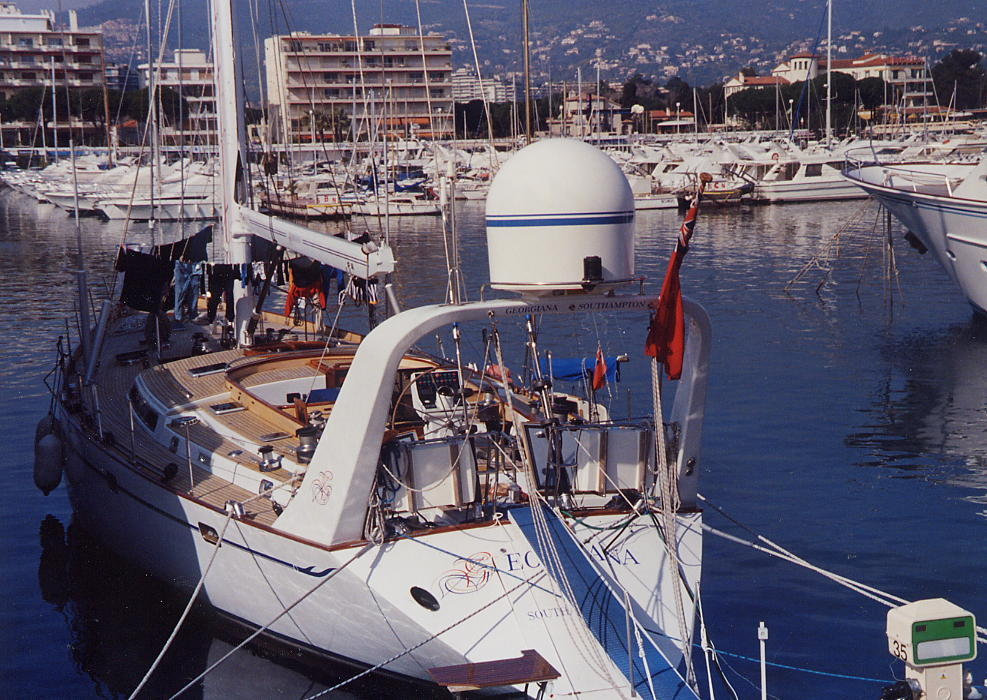
Inmarsat aerial (stern of the yacht)

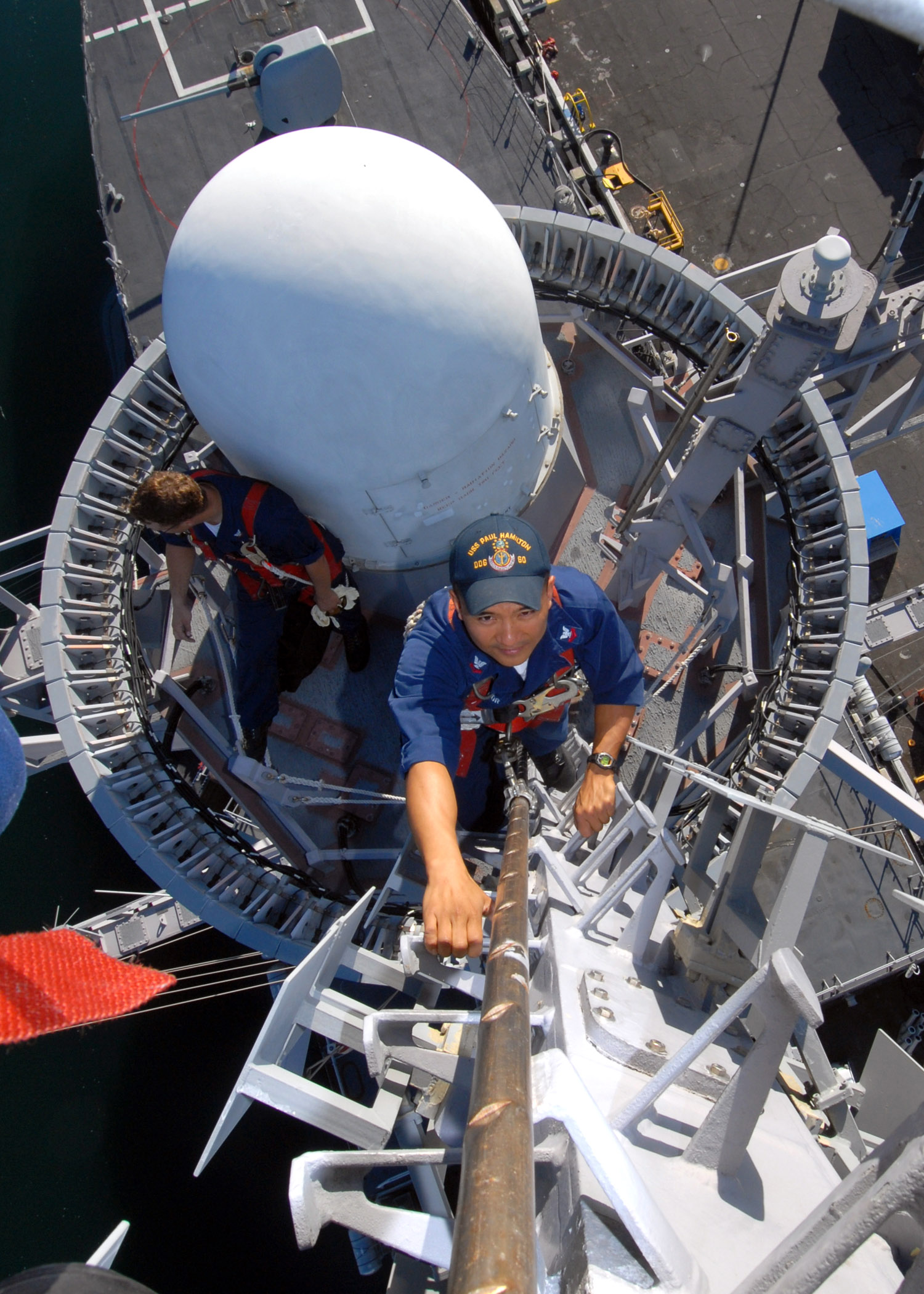
Inmarsat aerial of the US Navy

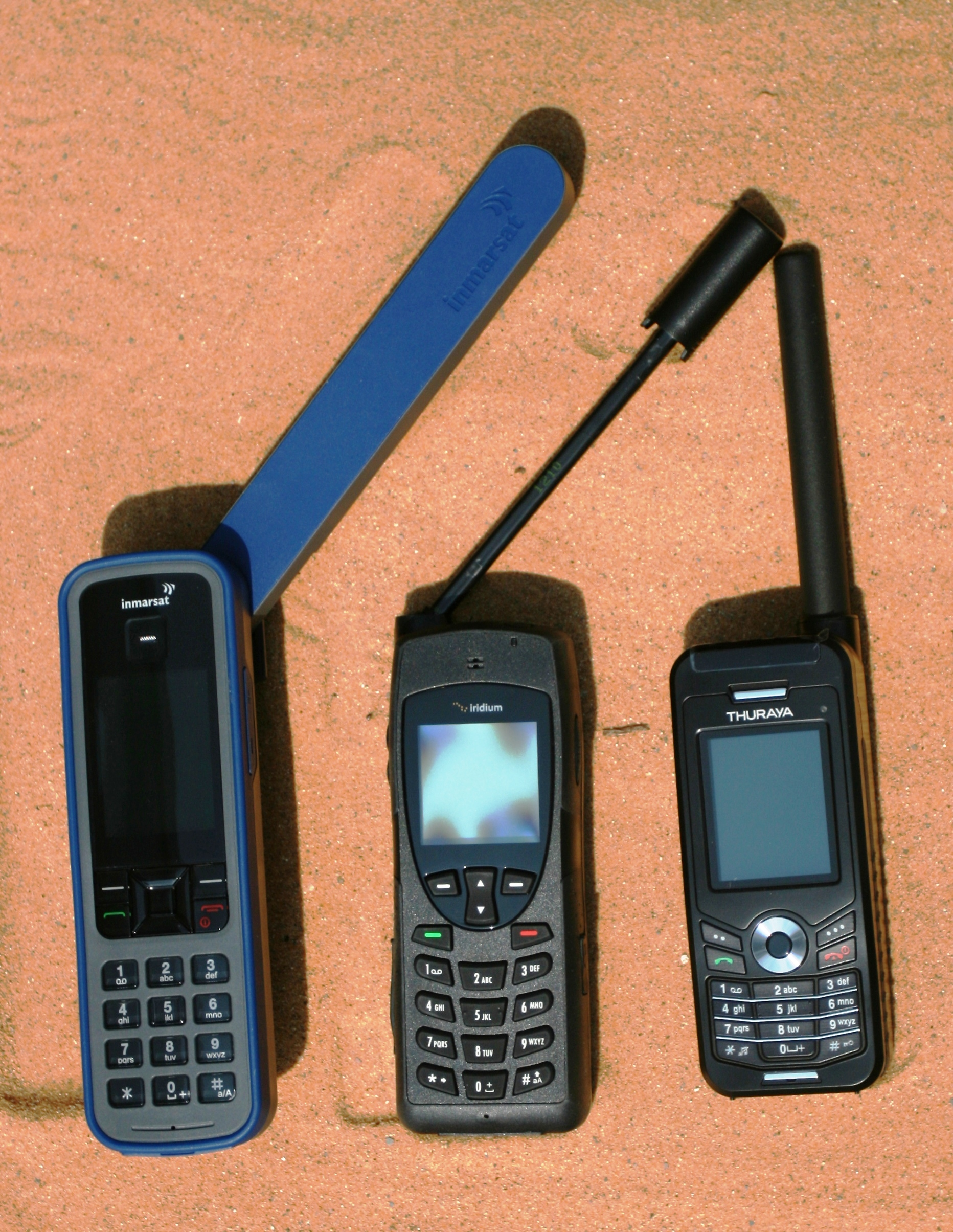
Hand-held radios of the MMSS

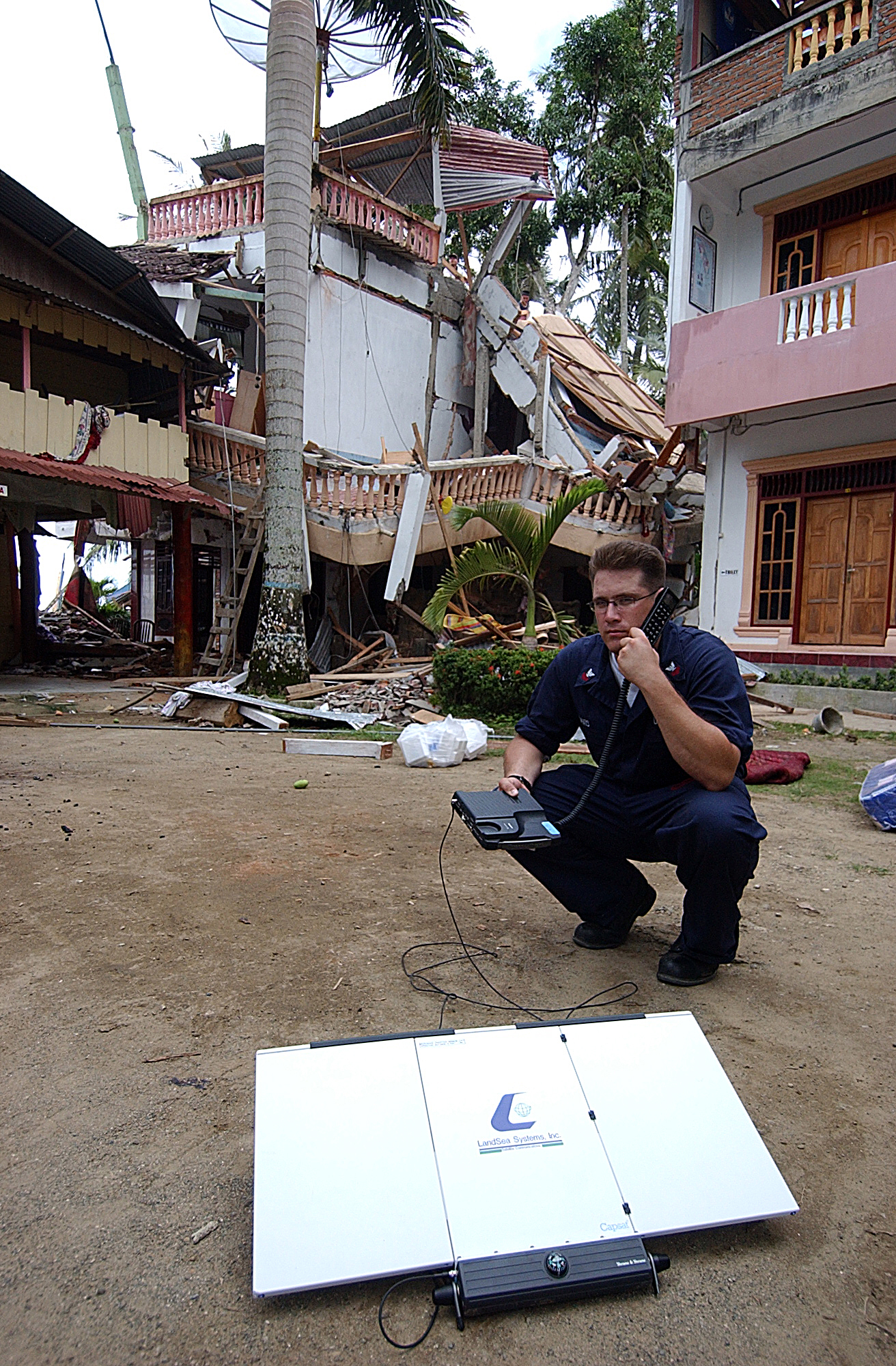
Inmarsat satellite telephone

== See also ==
- Radio station
- Radiocommunication service
