= Multi-satellite link =

Radio link utilizing multiple satellites in sequence

Multi-satellite link is – according to article 1.114 of the International Telecommunication Union's (ITU) ITU Radio Regulations (RR) – defined as «A radio link between a transmitting earth station and a receiving earth station through two or more satellites, without any intermediate earth station. A multi-satellite link comprises one up-link, one or more satellite-to-satellite links and one down-link.»

Each station shall be classified by the service in which it operates permanently or temporarily.

See also

== References / sources ==
- International Telecommunication Union (ITU)
