= Satellite system =

Satellite system may refer to:

- Satellite system (astronomy), a collection of objects orbiting around a planetary mass object
- Satellite constellation, a system of artificial satellites
  - Satellite navigation system, a system of artificial satellites that provide autonomous geo-spatial positioning with global coverage
- Satellite radio system, a space radio system using one or more artificial earth satellites
