= Satellite radio system =

Space system using artificial satellites

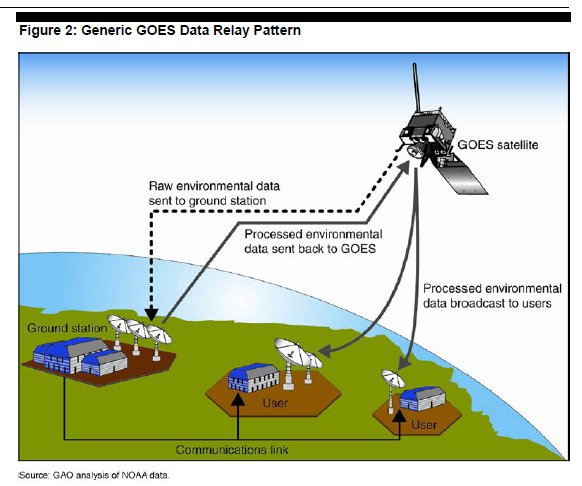
Satellite system with three earth stations and one space station

Satellite radio system (also: satellite system) is – according to article 1.111 of the International Telecommunication Union's (ITU) ITU Radio Regulations (RR) – defined as «A space system using one or more artificial earth satellites.»

Each system shall be classified by the service in which it operates permanently or temporarily.

== See also ==
- Radio station
- Radiocommunication service

== References / sources ==
- International Telecommunication Union (ITU)
