= Telecommunications link =

Communication channel between two or more devices

In a telecommunications network, a link is a communication channel that connects two or more devices for the purpose of data transmission. The link may be a dedicated physical link or a virtual circuit that uses one or more physical links or shares a physical link with other telecommunications links.

A telecommunications link is generally based on one of several types of information transmission paths such as those provided by communication satellites, terrestrial radio communications infrastructure (a radio link) and computer networks to connect two or more points.

The term link is widely used in computer networking to refer to the communications facilities that connect nodes of a network.

Sometimes the communications facilities that provide the communication channel that constitutes a link are also included in the definition of link.ipv4 for cell phone

== Types ==
=== Point-to-point ===
A point-to-point link is a dedicated link that connects exactly two communication facilities (e.g., two nodes of a network, an intercom station at an entryway with a single internal intercom station, a radio path between two points, etc.).

=== Broadcast ===
Broadcast links connect two or more nodes and support broadcast transmission, where one node can transmit so that all other nodes can receive the same transmission. A layer-1 Network segment in Ethernet is an example of this.

=== Multipoint ===
Also known as a multidrop link, a multipoint link is a link that connects two or more nodes. Also known as general topology networks, these include ATM and Frame Relay links, as well as X.25 networks when used as links for a network-layer protocol like IP.

Unlike broadcast links, there is no mechanism to efficiently send a single message to all other nodes without copying and retransmitting the message.

=== Point-to-multipoint ===
A point-to-multipoint link (or simply a multipoint) is a specific type of multipoint link which consists of a central connection endpoint (CE) that is connected to multiple peripheral CEs. All of the peripheral CEs receive any transmission of data that originates from the central CE while any transmission of data that originates from any of the peripheral CEs is only received by the central CE.

=== Private and public ===
Links are often referred to by terms that refer to the ownership or accessibility of the link.

- A private link is a link that is either owned by a specific entity or a link that is only accessible by a particular entity.
- A public link is a link that uses the public switched telephone network or other public utility or entity to provide the link and which may also be accessible by anyone.

== Direction ==
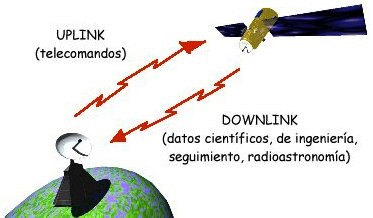
Feeder links, here: uplink / downlink

=== Uplink ===
- Pertaining to radiocommunication service, an uplink (UL or U/L) is the portion of a feeder link used for the transmission of signals from an earth station to a space radio station, space radio system or high altitude platform station.
- Pertaining to GSM and cellular networks, the radio uplink is the transmission path from the mobile station (cell phone) to a base station (cell site). Traffic and signalling flowing within the BSS and NSS may also be identified as uplink and downlink.
- Pertaining to computer networks, an uplink is a connection from data communications equipment toward the network core. This is also known as an upstream connection.

=== Downlink ===
- Pertaining to radiocommunication service, a downlink (DL or D/L) is the portion of a feeder link used for the transmission of signals from a space radio station, space radio system or high altitude platform station to an earth station.
- In the context of satellite communications, a downlink (DL) is the link from a satellite to a ground station.
- Pertaining to cellular networks, the radio downlink is the transmission path from a cell site to the cell phone. Traffic and signalling flowing within the base station subsystem (BSS) and network switching subsystem (NSS) may also be identified as uplink and downlink.
- Pertaining to computer networks, a downlink is a connection from data communications equipment toward data terminal equipment. This is also known as a downstream connection.

=== Forward link ===
A forward link is the link from a fixed location (e.g., a base station) to a mobile user. If the link includes a communications relay satellite, the forward link will consist of both an uplink (base station to satellite) and a downlink (satellite to mobile user).

=== Reverse link ===
The reverse link (sometimes called a return channel) is the link from a mobile user to a fixed base station.

If the link includes a communications relay satellite, the reverse link will consist of both an uplink (mobile station to satellite) and a downlink (satellite to base station) which together constitute a half hop.
