= Hector Fenech =

Hector Fenech is an electrical engineer and director of the Future Satellite Systems group at Eutelsat in Paris, France. He was named a Fellow of the Institute of Electrical and Electronics Engineers (IEEE) in 2014 for contributing to the definition of telecommunications satellite architectures and systems through innovation and technological exploitation. He was also named a fellow of the American Institute of Aeronautics and Astronautics and the Institution of Engineering and Technology.

== Early life and education ==
Fenech was born in Malta. He obtained his B.Sc. in engineering from the University of Malta in 1978 and in 1983 got his M.S. in electronic engineering from the Phillips International Institute of Technological Studies. He then traveled to the United Kingdom where he attended University of Bradford graduating with a Ph.D. in satellite communications in 1987.
