= Feeder line (network) =

Peripheral route or branch in a network

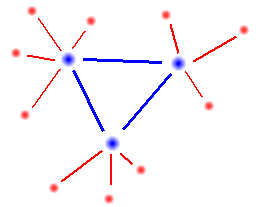
A diagram of a hierarchical communications network. Feeder lines (in red) provide communication with important nodes.

A feeder line is a peripheral route or branch in a network, which connects smaller or more remote nodes with a route or branch carrying heavier traffic. The term is applicable to any system based on a hierarchical network.

In telecommunications, a feeder line branches from a main line or trunk line.

In electrical engineering, a feeder line is a type of transmission line. In addition feeders are the power lines through which electricity is transmitted in power systems. Feeder transmits power from Generating station or substation to the distribution points. They are similar to distributors except the fact that there is no intermediate tapping done and hence the current flow remains same at the sending as well as the receiving end. In radio engineering, a feeder connects radio equipment to an antenna, usually open wire (air-insulated wire line) or twin-lead from a shortwave transmitter. In power engineering, a feeder line is part of an electric distribution network, usually a radial circuit of intermediate voltage.

== In public transport ==
The concept of feeder lines is important in public transportation. The term is particularly used in US air travel and rail transport. Feeder lines play a crucial role in public transportation systems by ensuring connectivity between high-capacity routes and more localized departure and destination points. In this hierarchical network, efficient, high-capacity routes serve as the main arteries, linking significant nodes such as major transit stations or central business districts. Feeder lines, on the other hand, branch off from these main routes, connecting smaller or more remote areas to these hubs. This structure helps facilitate smooth and efficient travel across a region, allowing passengers to transition seamlessly from local to long-distance travel segments.

For instance, in urban transit planning, bus routes often act as feeders to high-capacity systems like subways or light rail, collecting passengers from various neighborhoods and transporting them to major transit hubs. This setup is essential for optimizing the overall efficiency and accessibility of public transportation networks, ensuring that even areas not directly served by high-capacity routes can still benefit from the broader transit system.

== See also ==
- Feeder link
