= Space radio system =

Group of earth or space stations cooperating by radio

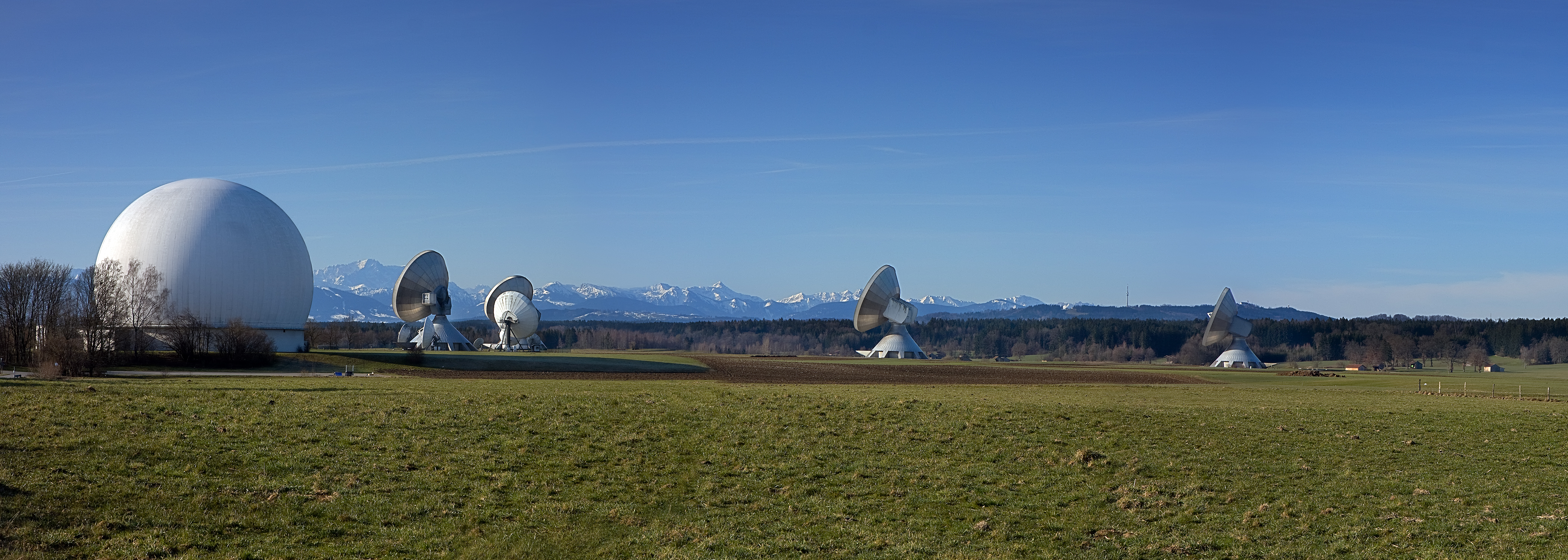
Space system, here: parabolic antennas and Radome of the earth station Raisting

Space radio system (also: space system) is – according to article 1.110 of the International Telecommunication Union's (ITU) ITU Radio Regulations (RR) – defined as "any group of cooperating earth stations and/or space stations employing space radiocommunication for specific purposes".

Each system shall be classified by the service in which it operates permanently or temporarily.
