= Crew calling =

Crew calling is the generic term for the non-business use of ship earth stations at sea. With mobile phones being reliable only to around five miles (8 km) off the coast, the crew on board merchant ships have until comparatively recently had few means of communicating with their families at home.

== History ==
Before the introduction of satellite communications enabled by the Inmarsat A terminal in the early 1980s, crew members relied on their ship's radio personnel to send either a telex or patch-through a radio-to-telephone message once their ship was at sea. When time in port between voyages could extend to several weeks this social isolation was usually manageable, but by 2001 average vessel turnaround times in port had declined to an overall mean of less than a day, while voyages could last several weeks. At a time when many shipowners complained that they could not find competent personnel, the lack of normal communications avenues such as SMS and mobile voice services was thought to be a possible contributory factor.
