= Feeder link =

Radio link between an earth and space station

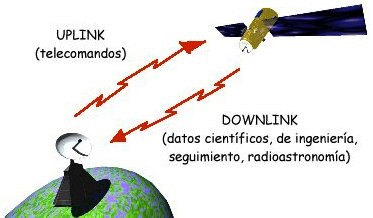
Uplink / downlink feeder links

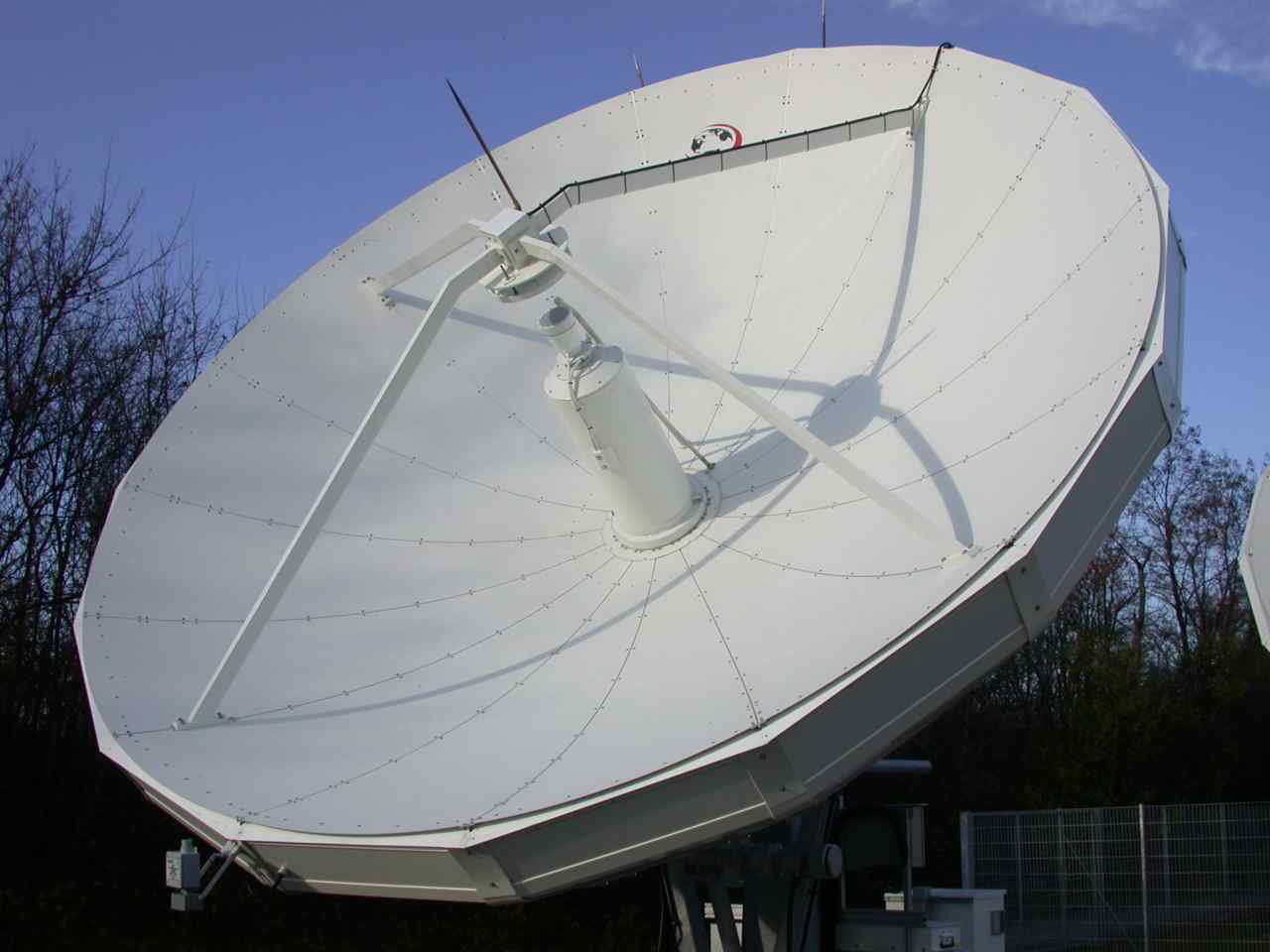
Aerial (earth station) for uplink radiocommunication

A feeder link is – according to Article 1.115 of the International Telecommunication Union´s (ITU) ITU Radio Regulations (RR) – defined as:

A radio link from an earth station at a given location to a space station, or vice versa, conveying information for a space radiocommunication service other than for the fixed-satellite service. The given location may be at a specified fixed point, or at any fixed point within specified areas.

Each station shall be classified by the service in which it operates permanently or temporarily.

== See also ==
- Radio station
- Radiocommunication service
