= Mobile satellite service =

Service for mobile phones to communicate with satellites

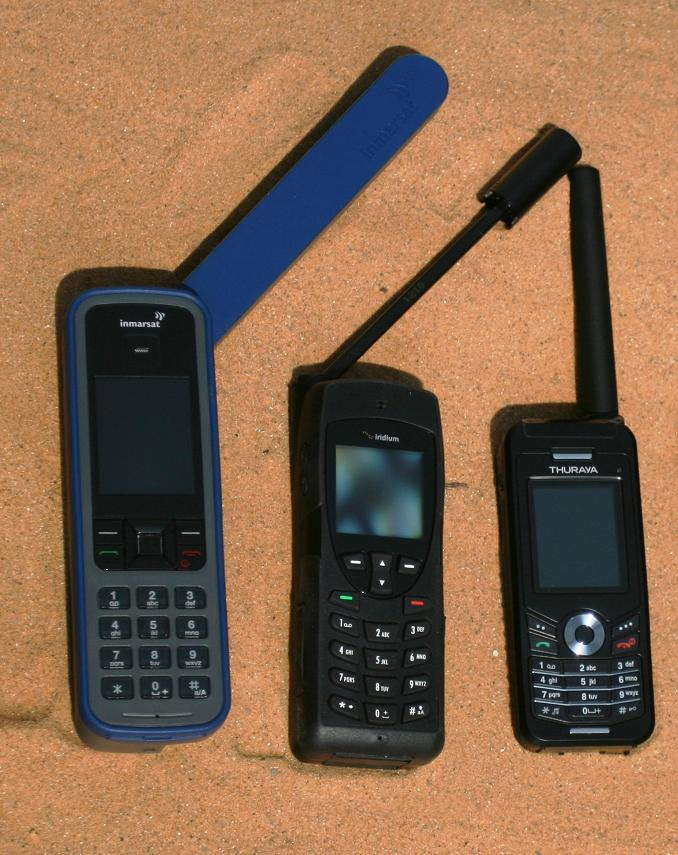
MSS mobile earth stations, here: satellite telephones which use the L-band

Mobile-satellite service (MSS, or mobile-satellite radiocommunication service) is – according to Article 1.25 of the International Telecommunication Union's Radio Regulations – "A radiocommunication service

- between mobile earth stations and one or more space stations, or between space stations used by this service; or
- between mobile earth stations by means of one or more space stations.

This service may also include feeder links necessary for its operation."

A mobile satellite services (MSS) terminal (Xponder) machine at 9th Bengaluru Space Expo 2026, BIEC

== Details ==
Most commercial voice and some data mobile satellite services are provided by systems operating in the L-band by Iridium, Inmarsat, Globalstar and Thuraya. The L-band spectrum allocated for MSS is between 1.5 and 2.5 GHz, with the upper portion often referred to as the S-band.

Constellations of low earth orbiting (LEO) satellites are used by Iridium (66 satellites) and Globalstar (48 satellites). Inmarsat and Thuraya currently use 4 (i4) and 2 geostationary satellites respectively, their L-band services are similar but not interoperable and most terminals can only use one or the other service, although some data terminals provide a mechanical switch required due to the different polarization schemes used by both systems.

Another MSS service is MSV / MSAT / LightSquared / Ligado with 2 geostationary satellites serving North America.

China has shown an upcoming S-band satellite phone which will use its recently launched Tiantong-1 geostationary satellite.

Additionally to the four active Inmarsat 4 ('I4') satellites, Inmarsat also maintains some legacy L-band services on its previous generation satellites, although they are being gradually phased out and users are invited to upgrade to i4-based services, mostly based on variations of BGAN.
Inmarsat also owns and operates a new fleet of three Ka-band satellites, known as the Inmarsat 5 constellation (usually abbreviated to 'I5'), providing high speed mobile satellite data services known as Global Express.

Other MSS systems currently inoperative were Ico / Pendrell, TerreStar and Ellipso.

Several governments also operate and use MSS systems, although most make extensive use of the Iridium and Inmarsat systems. Mexico is currently developing an S-band system based on its own geostationary satellites and the United States uses MUOS and other systems. The US Government also runs its own gateway in Hawaii for direct access to the Iridium constellation under a contract lasting at least until 2018.

=== Machine-to-machine ===
Orbcomm provides data-only M2M services using a constellation of LEO satellites in the VHF band and a partnership with Inmarsat for M2M services in the L-band. Iridium also has low bandwidth modes often used for M2M and Inmarsat offers an M2M version of BGAN called BGAN M2M.

=== Interoperability ===
Telephone calls to satellite terminals are often accomplished by dialing numbers assigned to the Global Mobile Satellite System, although most Globalstar users and some Iridium users are assigned country-based numbers. Thus, calls can be made to satellite phones from normal land-line and cellular terminals. However, pricing for terrestrial-satellite is often higher than pricing for satellite-terrestrial and satellite-satellite calls. Satellite-based Internet access is also fully interoperable with traditional land-based and mobile Internet and can access the same services, although cost is usually much higher and satellite link latency can affect some interactive services. Also, due to security concerns, the satellite segment and end-user can be (and in the case of BGAN often are) behind a NAT.

=== Commercial access ===
In most territories, access to mobile satellite service is managed by traditional telecom companies and specialized resellers which market hardware, software and network access to end users, although occasionally some constellation operators also market service directly to end users. Some companies providing commercial access:

- Avanti
- Globalsat Group
- Iridium Communications
- Inmarsat
- Telespazio
- Thuraya
- Vizada

== Classification ==
In accordance with ITU Radio Regulations (article 1) variations of this radiocommunication service are classified as follows:
Mobile service (article 1.24)

- Mobile-satellite service (article 1.25)
  - Land mobile-satellite service (article 1.27)
  - Maritime mobile-satellite service (article 1.29)
  - Aeronautical mobile-satellite service (article 1.35)

== Frequency allocation ==
The allocation of radio frequencies is provided according to Article 5 of the ITU Radio Regulations (edition 2012).

In order to improve harmonisation in spectrum utilisation, the majority of service-allocations stipulated in this document were incorporated in national Tables of Frequency Allocations and Utilisations which is with-in the responsibility of the appropriate national administration. The allocation might be primary, secondary, exclusive, and shared.

- primary allocation: is indicated by writing in capital letters (see example below)
- secondary allocation: is indicated by small letters
- exclusive or shared utilization: is within the responsibility of administrations

Example of frequency allocation

Allocation to services
Region 1	Region 2	Region 3
137–137.025 MHz SPACE OPERATION (space-to-Earth); METEOROLOGICAL-SATELLITE (space-to-Earth); MOBILE-SATELLITE (space-to-Earth); SPACE RESEARCH (space-to-Earth); Fixed; Mobile exce
137.025–137.175 Mobile-satellite (space-to-Earth) and other services
137.175–137.825 MOBILE-SATELLITE (space-to-Earth) and other services
148–149.9; FIXED; MOBILE except aeronautical mobile (R); MOBILE-SATELLITE (Earth-to-space)	148-149.9 FIXED; MOBILE; MOBILE-SATELLITE (Earth-to-space)	
149.9–150.05 MOBILE-SATELLITE (Earth-to-space); RADIONAVIGATION-SATELLITE
156.7625-156.7875; MARITIME MOBILE; Mobile-satellite (Earth-to-space)	156.8125-156.8375; MARITIME MOBILE; MOBILE-SATELLITE (Earth-to-space)	156.8125-156.8375; MARITIME MOBILE; Mobile-satellite (Earth-to-space)
14–14.25 GHz FIXED-SATELLITE (Earth-to-space); RADIONAVIGATION; Mobile-satellite (Earth-to-space); Space research
14.25–14.3 FIXED-SATELLITE (Earth-to-space); RADIONAVIGATION; Mobile-satellite (Earth-to-space); Space research

== Industry Organizations ==
=== Mobile Satellite Services Association (MSSA) ===
In February 2024, companies focused on promoting the direct-to-device (D2D) ecosystem using L- and S-band spectrum already licensed for MSS usage formed the Mobile Satellite Services Association (MSSA). Founding members are Viasat, Terrestar Solutions, Ligado Networks, Omnispace, and Yahsat. Ericsson also joined the association in September 2024

== See also ==
- Satellite phone
- Radio station
