= ITU Region =

Regions used for managing the global radio spectrum

ITU regions and the dividing lines between them. Region 1 Region 2 Region 3

The International Telecommunication Union (ITU), in its International Radio Regulations, divides the world into three ITU regions for the purposes of managing the global radio spectrum. Each region has its own set of frequency allocations, the main reason for defining the regions.

== Boundaries ==
- Region 1 comprises Europe, Africa, the Commonwealth of Independent States, Mongolia, and the Middle East west of the Persian Gulf, including Iraq.
  - The western boundary is defined by Line B and the eastern boundary is defined by Line A, except that all territory of Iran is excluded, and all territory of Armenia, Azerbaijan, Georgia, Kazakhstan, Mongolia, Uzbekistan, Kyrgyzstan, Russia, Tajikistan, Turkmenistan, Turkey and Ukraine and the area to the north of Russia which lies between lines A and C is included.
- Region 2 covers the Americas including Greenland, and some of the eastern Pacific Islands.
  - The eastern boundary is defined by Line B and the western boundary is defined by Line C.
- Region 3 contains most of non-FSU Asia east of and including Iran, and most of Oceania.
  - The western boundary is defined by Line A and the eastern boundary is defined by Line C.

Lines:

- Line A is a line running from the North Pole along meridian 40° East of Greenwich to parallel 40° North; thence by great circle arc to the intersection of meridian 60° East and the Tropic of Cancer; thence along the meridian 60° East to the South Pole.
- Line B is a line running from the North Pole along meridian 10° West of Greenwich to its intersection with parallel 72° North; thence by great circle arc to the intersection of meridian 50° West and parallel 40° North; thence by great circle arc to the intersection of meridian 20° West and parallel 10° South; thence along meridian 20° West to the South Pole.
- Line C is a line running from the North Pole by great circle arc to the intersection of parallel 65° 30` North with the international boundary in the Bering Strait; thence by great circle arc to the intersection of meridian 165° East of Greenwich and parallel 50° North; thence by great circle arc to the intersection of meridian 170° West and parallel 10° North; thence along parallel 10° North to its intersection with meridian 120° West; thence along meridian 120° West to the South Pole.

== Usage ==
The definition of the European Broadcasting Area uses some of the definitions of Region 1.

== ITU Zones ==
For convenience the regions are further divided into a total of 90 zones. While often following political boundaries, in more remote land and sea areas these are often defined to be roughly equal in size and so can have very low populations. As examples, Antarctica is divided into seven zones, and in one Pacific Ocean zone the only land area is tiny Minami Torishima. For certain awards and contests amateur radio operators may attempt to contact as many zones as possible.
