= Mobile radio =

Wireless communications systems using radio frequencies

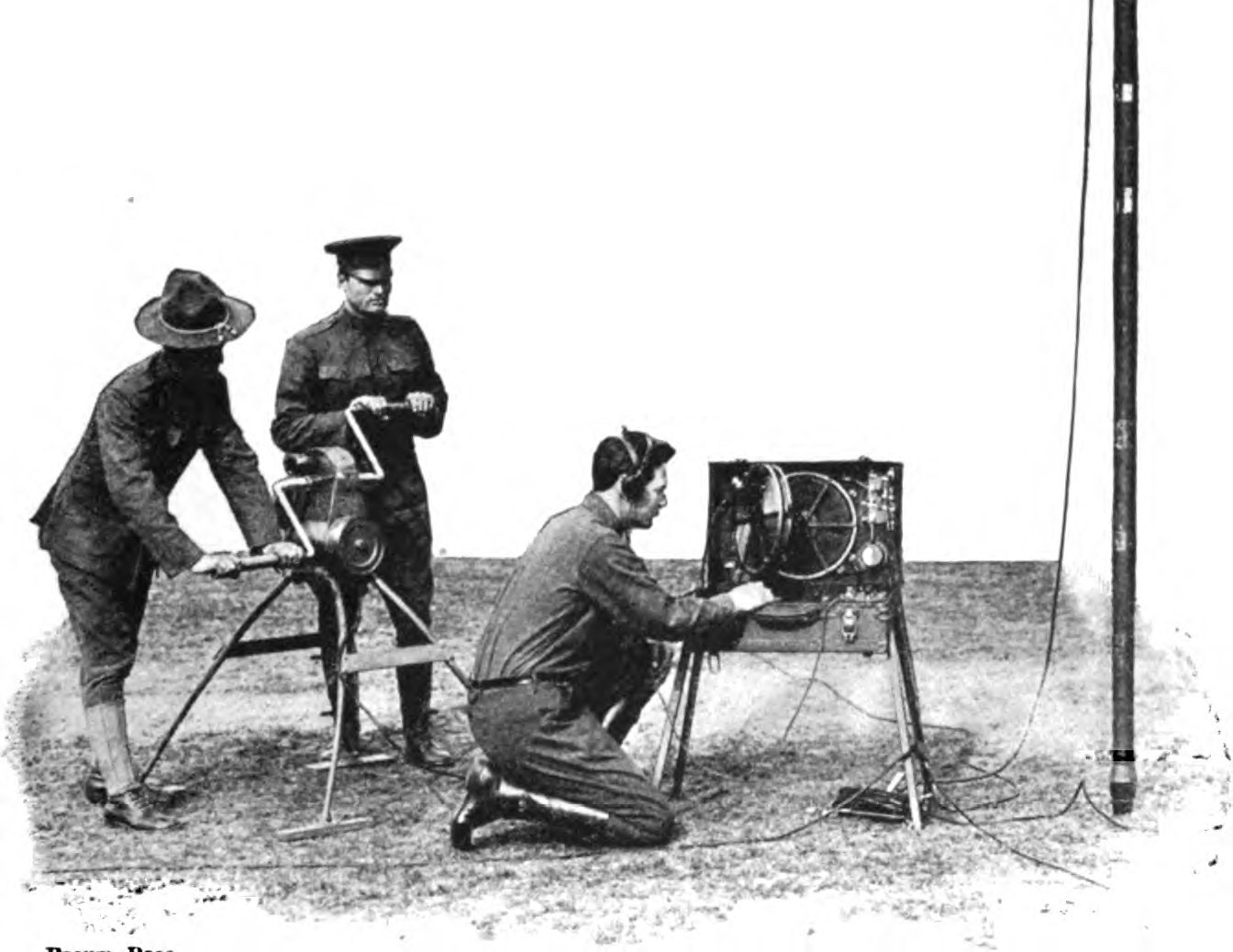
National Guard operating a mobile radio station (1922)

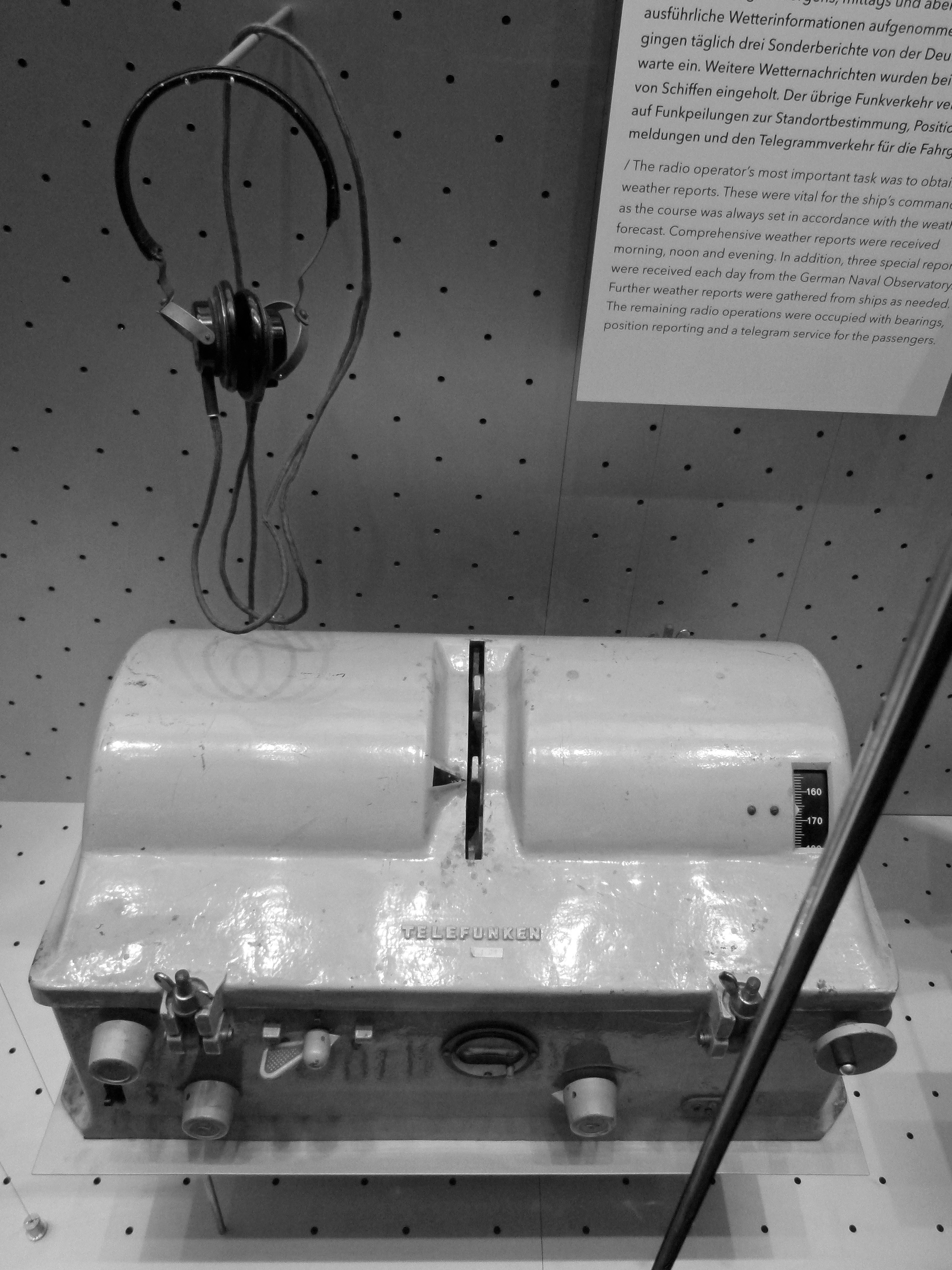
Mobile radio on board of a Zeppelin

Mobile radio or mobiles refer to wireless communications systems and devices which are based on radio frequencies (using commonly UHF or VHF frequencies), and where the path of communications is movable on either end. There are a variety of views about what constitutes mobile equipment. For US licensing purposes, mobiles may include hand-carried, (sometimes called portable), equipment. An obsolete term is radiophone. (Note: Cited in many references including on escutcheons and silk-screened face plates on 1960s Motorola products including early HT-200 and Dispatcher-series mobiles. Later HT-200s dropped the term.)

A sales person or radio repair shop would understand the word mobile to mean vehicle-mounted: a transmitter-receiver (transceiver) used for radio communications from a vehicle. Mobile radios are mounted to a motor vehicle usually with the microphone and control panel in reach of the driver. In the US, such a device is typically powered by the host vehicle's 12 Volt electrical system.

Some mobile radios are mounted in aircraft (aeronautical mobile), shipboard (maritime mobile), on motorcycles, or railroad locomotives. Power may vary with each platform. For example, a mobile radio installed in a locomotive would run off of 72 or 30 Volt DC power. A large ship with 117 V AC power might have a base station mounted on the ship's bridge.

According to article 1.67 of the ITU, a mobile radio is "A station in the mobile service intended to be used while in motion or during halts at unspecified points."

== Nomenclature: Two-way versus telephone ==
The distinction between radiotelephones and two-way radio is becoming blurred as the two technologies merge. The backbone or infrastructure supporting the system defines which category or taxonomy applies. A parallel to this concept is the convergence of computing and telephones.

Radiotelephones are full-duplex (simultaneous talk and listen), circuit switched, and primarily communicate with telephones connected to the public switched telephone network. The connection sets up based on the user dialing. The connection is taken down when the end button is pressed. They run on telephony-based infrastructure such as AMPS or GSM.

Two-way radio is primarily a dispatch tool intended to communicate in simplex or half-duplex modes using push-to-talk, and primarily intended to communicate with other radios rather than telephones. These systems run on push-to-talk-based infrastructure such as Nextel's iDEN, Specialized Mobile Radio (SMR), MPT-1327, Enhanced Specialized Mobile Radio (ESMR) or conventional two-way systems. Certain modern two-way radio systems may have full-duplex telephone capability.

== History ==
Early users of mobile radio equipment included transportation and government. These systems used one-way broadcasting instead of two-way conversations. Railroads used medium frequency range (MF) communications (similar to the AM broadcast band) to improve safety. Instead of hanging out of a locomotive cab and grabbing train orders while rolling past a station, voice communications with rolling trains became possible. Radios linked the caboose with the locomotive cab. Early police radio systems were initially one way using MF frequencies above the AM broadcast band, (1.7 MHz). Some early systems talked back to dispatch on a 30-50 MHz link, (called crossband).

Early mobile radios used amplitude modulation (AM) to convey intelligence through the communications channel. In time, problems with sources of electrical noise showed that frequency modulation (FM) was superior for its ability to cope with vehicle ignition and power line noise. The frequency range used by most early radio systems, 25–50 MHz (vhf "low band") is particularly susceptible to the problem of electrical noise. This plus the need for more channels led to the eventual expansion of two-way radio communications into the VHF "high band" (150–174 MHz) and UHF (450–470 MHz). The UHF band has since been expanded again.

One of the major challenges in early mobile radio technology was that of converting the six or twelve volt power supply of the vehicle to the high voltage needed to operate the vacuum tubes in the radio. Early tube-type radios used dynamotors - essentially a six or twelve volt motor that turned a generator to provide the high voltages required by the vacuum tubes. Some early mobile radios were the size of a suitcase or had separate boxes for the transmitter and receiver. As time went on, power supply technology evolved to use first electromechanical vibrators, then solid-state power supplies to provide high voltage for the vacuum tubes. These circuits, called "inverters", changed the 6 or 12 V direct current (DC) to alternating current (AC) which could be passed through a transformer to make high voltage. The power supply then rectified this high voltage to make the high voltage DC required for the vacuum tubes, (called valves in British English). The power supplies needed to power vacuum tube radios resulted in a common trait of tube-type mobile radios: their heavy weight due to the iron-core transformers in the power supplies. These high voltage power supplies were inefficient, and the filaments of the vacuum tubes added to current demands, taxing vehicle electrical systems. Sometimes, a generator or alternator upgrade was needed to support the current required for a tube-type mobile radio.

Examples of US 1950s-1960s tube-type mobile radios with no transistors:

- Motorola FMTRU-140D (dynamotor powered)
- Motorola Twin-V, named for its "universal" 6 or 12 Volt power supply
- General Electric Progress Line (Early models without "T-Power" power supply)
- Kaar Engineering Model 501

Equipment from different US manufacturers had similar traits. This was partly dictated by Federal Communications Commission (FCC) regulations. The requirement that unauthorized persons be prohibited from using the radio transmitter meant that many radios were wired so they could not transmit unless the vehicle ignition was on. Persons without a key to the vehicle could not transmit. Equipment had to be "type accepted", or technically approved, by the FCC before it could be offered for sale. In order to be type accepted, the radio set had to be equipped with an indicator light, usually green or yellow, that showed power was applied and the radio was ready to transmit. Radios were also required to have a lamp (usually red) indicating when the transmitter was on. These traits continue in the design of modern radios.

Early tube-type radios operated on 50 kHz channel spacing with ±15 kHz modulation deviation. This meant that the number of radio channels that could be accommodated in the available radio frequency spectrum were limited to a certain number, dictated by the bandwidth of the signal on each channel.

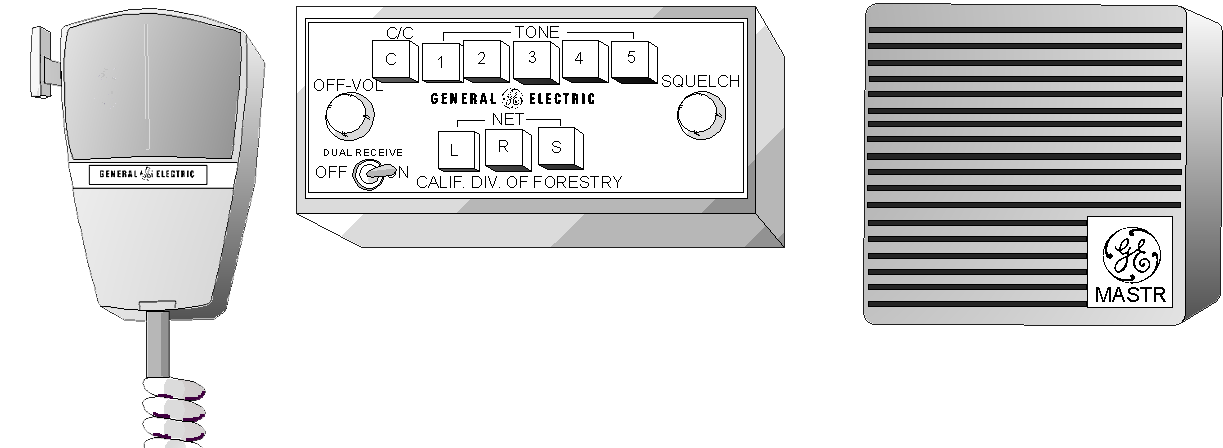
In the early 1970s, the California Department of Forestry requirement for 6 frequency transmit, 3 frequency receive, scanning, and a 5 tone burst encoder was unusual, leading to this custom-built mobile radio.

Solid-state electronic equipment arrived in the 1960s, with more efficient circuitry and smaller size. Metal–oxide–semiconductor (MOS) large-scale integration (LSI) provided a practical and economic solution for radio technology, and was used in mobile radio systems by the early 1970s. Channel spacing narrowed to 20–30 kHz with modulation deviation dropping to ±5 kHz. This was done to allow more radio spectrum availability to accommodate the rapidly growing national group of two-way radio users. By the mid-1970s, tube-type transmitter power amplifiers had been replaced with high-power transistors. From the 1960s to the 1980s, large system users with specialized requirements often had custom built radios designed for their unique systems. Systems with multiple-CTCSS tone encoders and more than two channels were unusual. Manufacturers of mobile radios built customized equipment for large radio fleets such as the California Department of Forestry and the California Highway Patrol.

Examples of US hybrid partially solid state mobile radios:

- Motorola Motrac
- Motorola MJ IMTS Car Telephone (1963)
- General Electric Transistorized Progress Line
- General Electric MASTR Professional and MASTR Executive
- RCA Super Carfone

== Today ==
Custom design for a particular customer is a thing of the past. Modern mobile radio equipment is "feature rich". A mobile radio may have 100 or more channels, be microprocessor controlled and have built-in options such as unit ID. A computer and software is typically required to program the features and channels of the mobile radio. Menus of options may be several levels deep and offer a complicated array of possibilities. Some mobile radios have alphanumeric displays that translate channel numbers (F1, F2) to a phrase more meaningful to the user, such as "Providence Base", "Boston Base", etc. Radios are now designed with a myriad of features to preclude the need for custom design. For example, Hytera's HM68X mobile radio, which was introduced in September 2022, offers a variety of features, including GPS location, emergency alarm, noise cancellation, and more.

Examples of US microprocessor-controlled mobile radios:

- Motorola Astro Digital Spectra W9
- Kenwood TK-690
- PositionPTT mobile-radio-m94g

As use of mobile radio equipment has virtually exploded, channel spacing has had to be narrowed again to 12.5–15 kHz with modulation deviation dropped to ±2.5 kilohertz. In order to fit into smaller, more economical vehicles, today's radios are trending toward radically smaller sizes than their tube-type ancestors.
The traditional analogue radio communications have been surpassed by digital radio voice communications capabilities that provide greater clarity of transmission, enable security features such as encryption and, within the network, allow low band data transmissions to accommodate simple text or picture messaging as an example. (Examples: Project 25(APCO-25), Terrestrial Trunked Radio (TETRA), DMR.)

== Details ==
Commercial and professional mobile radios are often purchased from an equipment supplier or dealer whose staff will install the equipment into the user's vehicles. Large fleet users may buy radios directly from an equipment manufacturer and may even employ their own technical staff for installation and maintenance.

A modern mobile radio consists of a radio transceiver, housed in a single box, and a microphone with a push-to-talk button. Each installation would also have a vehicle-mounted antenna connected to the transceiver by a coaxial cable. Some models may have an external, separate speaker which can be positioned and oriented facing the driver to overcome ambient road noise present when driving. The installer would have to locate this equipment in a way that does not interfere with the vehicle's sun roof, electronic engine management system, vehicle stability computer, or air bags.

Mobile radios installed on motorcycles are subject to extreme vibration and weather. Professional equipment designed for use on motorcycles is weather and vibration resistant. Shock mounting systems are used to reduce the radio's exposure to vibration imparted by the motorcycle's modal, or resonant, shaking.

Some mobile radios use noise-canceling microphones or headsets. At speeds over 100 MPH, the ambient road and wind noise can make radio communications difficult to understand. For example, California Highway Patrol mobile radios have noise-canceling microphones which reduce road and siren noise heard by the dispatcher. Most fire engines and radios in heavy equipment use noise-canceling headsets. These protect the occupant's hearing and reduce background noise in the transmitted audio. Noise-canceling microphones require the operator speak directly into the front of the microphone. Hole arrays in the back of the microphone pick up ambient noise. This is applied, out-of-phase, to the back of the microphone, effectively reducing or canceling any sound which is present both in front and back of the microphone. Ideally, only the voice present on the front side of the microphone goes out on the air.

Many radios are equipped with transmitter time-out timers which limit the length of a transmission. A bane of push-to-talk systems is the stuck microphone: A radio locked on transmit, which disrupts communications on a two-way radio system. One example of this problem occurred in a car with a concealed two-way radio installation where the microphone and coiled cord were hidden inside the glove box. An operator tossed the mike into the glove box and shut it, causing the push-to-talk button to be depressed and locking the transmitter on. On taxi systems, a driver may be upset when a dispatcher assigns a call (s)he wanted to another driver and may deliberately hold the transmit button down (for which the owner can be fined by the FCC). Radios with time-out timers transmit for the preset amount of time, usually 30–60 seconds, after which the transmitter automatically turns off and a loud tone comes out of the radio speaker. The volume level of the tone on some radios is loud and cannot be adjusted. As soon as the push-to-talk button is released, the tone stops and the timer resets.

Mobile radio equipment is manufactured to specifications developed by the Electronic Industries Association/Telecommunications Industry Association (EIA/TIA). These specifications have been developed to help assure the user that mobile radio equipment performs as expected and to prevent the sale and distribution of inferior equipment which could degrade communications.

== Antenna ==
A mobile radio must have an associated antenna. The most common antennas are stainless steel wire or rod whips which protrude vertically from the vehicle. Physics defines the antenna length: length relates to frequency and cannot be arbitrarily lengthened or shortened (more likely) by the end user. The standard "quarter wave" antenna in the 25-50 MHz range can be over nine feet long. A 900 MHz antenna may be three inches long for a quarter wavelength. A transit bus may have a ruggedized antenna, which looks like a white plastic blade or fin, on its roof. Some vehicles with concealed radio installations have antennas designed to look like the original AM/FM antenna, a rearview mirror, or may be installed inside windows, or hidden on the floor pan or underside of a vehicle. Aircraft antennas look like blades or fins, the size and shape being determined by frequencies used. Microwave antennas may look like flat panels on the aircraft's skin. Temporary installations may have antennas which clip on to vehicle parts or are attached to steel body parts by a strong magnet.

Though initially relatively inexpensive mobile radio system components, frequently damaged antennas can be costly to replace since they are usually not included in maintenance contracts for mobile radio fleets. Some types of vehicles in 24-hour use, with stiff suspensions, tall heights, or rough diesel engine idle vibrations may damage antennas quickly. The location and type of antenna can affect system performance drastically. Large fleets usually test a few vehicles before making a commitment to a certain antenna location or type.

U.S. Occupational Safety and Health Administration guidelines for non-ionizing radio energy generally say the radio antenna must be two feet from any vehicle occupants. This rule of thumb is intended to prevent passengers from being exposed to unsafe levels of radio frequency energy when the radio transmits.

== Multiple radio sets ==
Dispatch-reliant services, such as tow cars or ambulances, may have several radios in each vehicle. For example, tow cars may have one radio for towing company communications and a second for emergency road service communications. Ambulances may have a similar arrangement with one radio for government emergency medical services dispatch and one for company dispatch.

=== Multiple controls, microphones ===
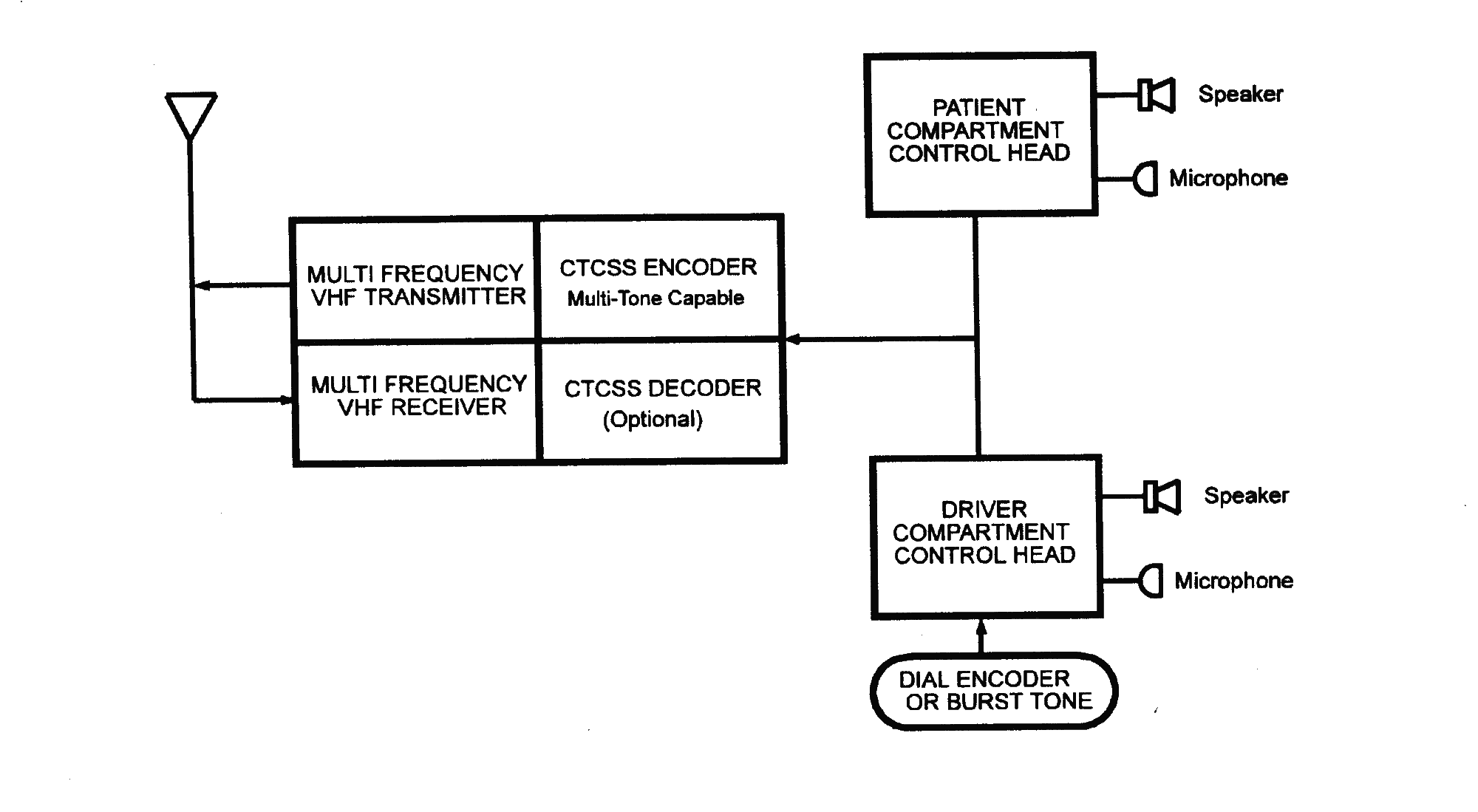
A mobile radio in a US ambulance often has two sets of controls: one in the patient area and another near the driver.

US ambulances often have radios with dual controls and dual microphones allowing the radio to be used from the patient care area in the rear or from the vehicle's cab.

=== Data radio ===
Both tow cars and ambulances may have an additional radio which transmits and receives to support a mobile data terminal. A data terminal radio allows data communications to take place over the separate radio. In the same way that a facsimile machine has a separate phone line, this means data and voice communication can take place simultaneously over a separate radio. Early Federal Express (FedEx) radio systems used a single radio for data and voice. The radio had a request-to-speak button which, when acknowledged, allowed voice communication to the dispatch center.

Each radio works over a single band of frequencies. If a tow car company had a frequency on the same band as its auto club, a single radio with scanning might be employed for both systems. Since a mobile radio typically works on a single frequency band, multiple radios may be required in cases where communications take place over systems on more than one frequency band.

== Walkie talkie converters in place of mobile radios ==
Intended as a cost savings, some systems employ vehicular chargers instead of a mobile radio. Each radio user is issued a walkie talkie. Each vehicle is equipped with a charger system console. The walkie talkie inserted into a vehicular charger or converter while the user is in the vehicle. The charger or converter (1) connects the walkie talkie to the vehicle's two-way radio antenna, (2) connects an amplified speaker, (3) connects a mobile microphone, and (4) charges the walkie talkie's battery. (Note: For example, Motorola has trademarked the name Converta-Com for a system which accomplishes all three of these tasks. Some Converta-Com systems allow the attachment of signaling devices or external devices not usually compatible with walkie talkies. One historic example is the NLN-4470A for MT-500 series radios.) The weak point of these systems has been connector technology which has been proven unreliable in some installations. Receiver performance is a problem in congested radio signal and urban areas. These installations are sometimes referred to as jerk-and-run systems.

== See also ==
- Land mobile radio
