= Land mobile-satellite service =

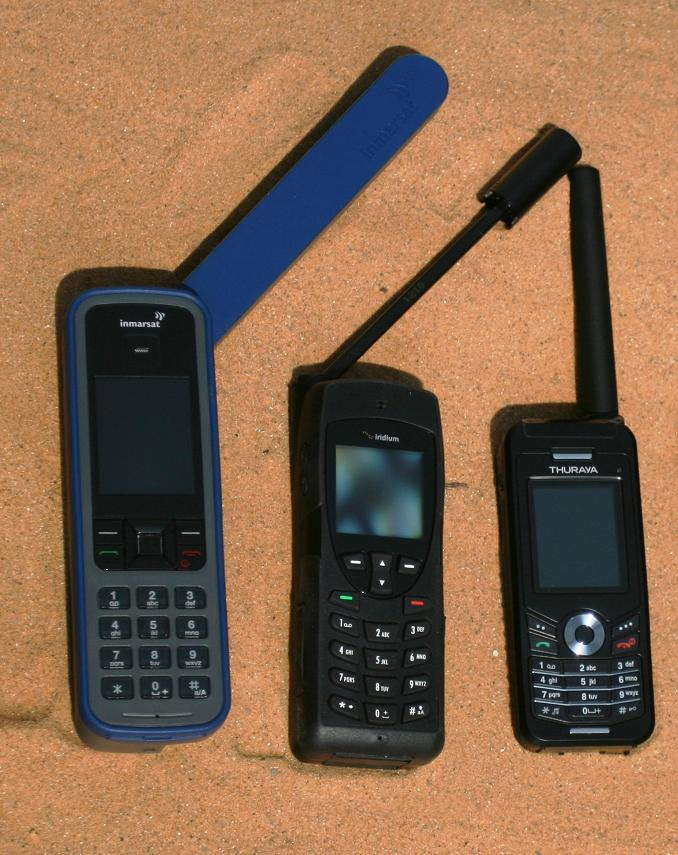
Mobile-satellite telephones

Land mobile-satellite service (short: LMSS; also: Land mobile-satellite radiocommunication service') is – according to Article 1.27 of the International Telecommunication Union's (ITU) Radio Regulations (RR) – defined as «A mobile-satellite service in which mobile earth stations are located on land.»

See also

== Classification ==
Variations of this radiocommunication service in line to the ITU Radio Regulations article 1 are as follows :
Mobile service (article 1.24)

- Mobile-satellite service (article 1.25)
  - Land mobile-satellite service (article 1.27)

== Frequency allocation ==
The allocation of radio frequencies is provided according to Article 5 of the ITU Radio Regulations (edition 2012).

In order to improve harmonisation in spectrum utilisation, the majority of service-allocations stipulated in this document were incorporated in national Tables of Frequency Allocations and Utilisations which is with-in the responsibility of the appropriate national administration. The allocation might be primary, secondary, exclusive, and shared.

- primary allocation: is indicated by writing in capital letters
- secondary allocation: is indicated by small letters (see example below)
- exclusive or shared utilization: is within the responsibility of administrations

== References / sources ==
- International Telecommunication Union (ITU)
