= Fixed-satellite service =

Telecommunication subcategory

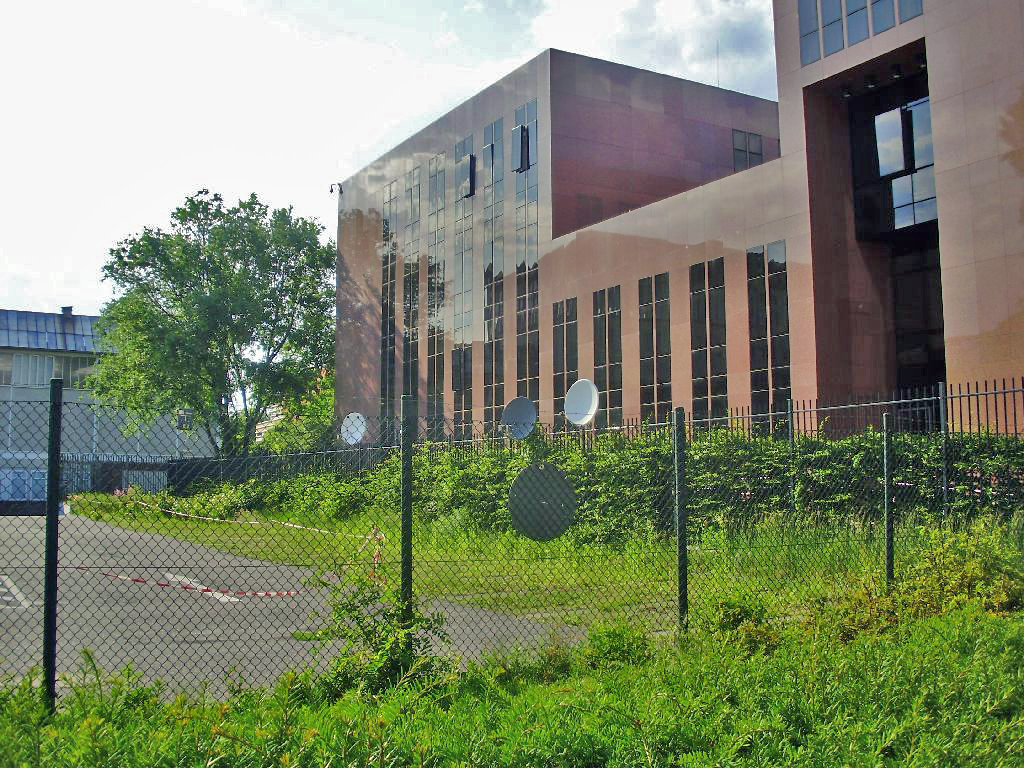
Satellite dishes on the embassy of Egypt in Berlin (2009)

Fixed-satellite service (FSS, or fixed-satellite radiocommunication service) is – according to article 1.21 of the International Telecommunication Union's (ITU) Radio Regulations (RR) – defined as A radiocommunication service between earth stations at given positions, when one or more satellites are used; the given position may be a specified fixed point or any fixed point within specified areas; in some cases this service includes satellite-to-satellite links, which may also be operated in the inter-satellite service; the fixed-satellite service may also include feeder links for other space radiocommunication services.

== Classification ==
This radiocommunication service is classified in accordance with ITU Radio Regulations (article 1) as follows:
Fixed service (article 1.20)

- Fixed-satellite service (article 1.21)
- Inter-satellite service (article 1.22)
- Earth exploration-satellite service (article 1.51)
  - Meteorological-satellite service (article 1.52)

== Frequency allocation ==
The allocation of radio frequencies is provided according to Article 5 of the ITU Radio Regulations (most recent version, Edition of 2020).

In order to improve harmonisation in spectrum utilisation, the majority of service-allocations stipulated in this document were incorporated in national Tables of Frequency Allocations and Utilisations which is within the responsibility of the appropriate national administration. The allocation might be primary, secondary, exclusive, and shared.

- primary allocation: is indicated by writing in capital letters (see example below)
- secondary allocation: is indicated by small letters
- exclusive or shared utilization: is within the responsibility of administrations

Example of frequency allocation

Allocation to services
Region 1	Region 2	Region 3
14–14.25 GHz FIXED-SATELLITE (Earth-to-space); RADIONAVIGATION; Mobile-satellite (Earth-to-space); Space research
14.25–14.3 FIXED-SATELLITE (Earth-to-space); RADIONAVIGATION; Mobile-satellite (Earth-to-space); Space research

== Use in North America ==
FSS – is as well the official classification (used chiefly in North America) for geostationary communications satellites that provide broadcast feeds to television stations, radio stations and broadcast networks. FSSs also transmit information for telephony, telecommunications, and data communications.
