= Aeronautical mobile service =

Aviation communication by means of radio

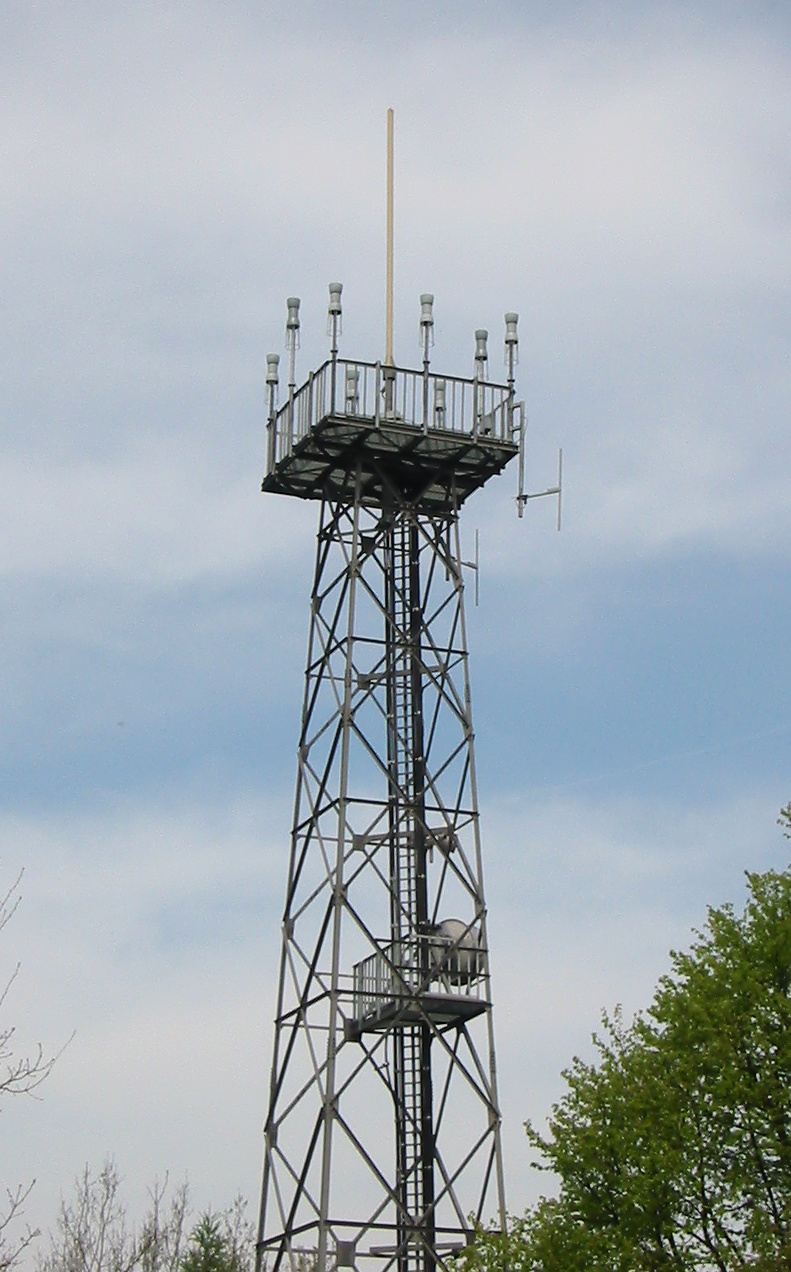
Aeronautical station of the Aeronautical mobile (R) service near Hannover, Germany

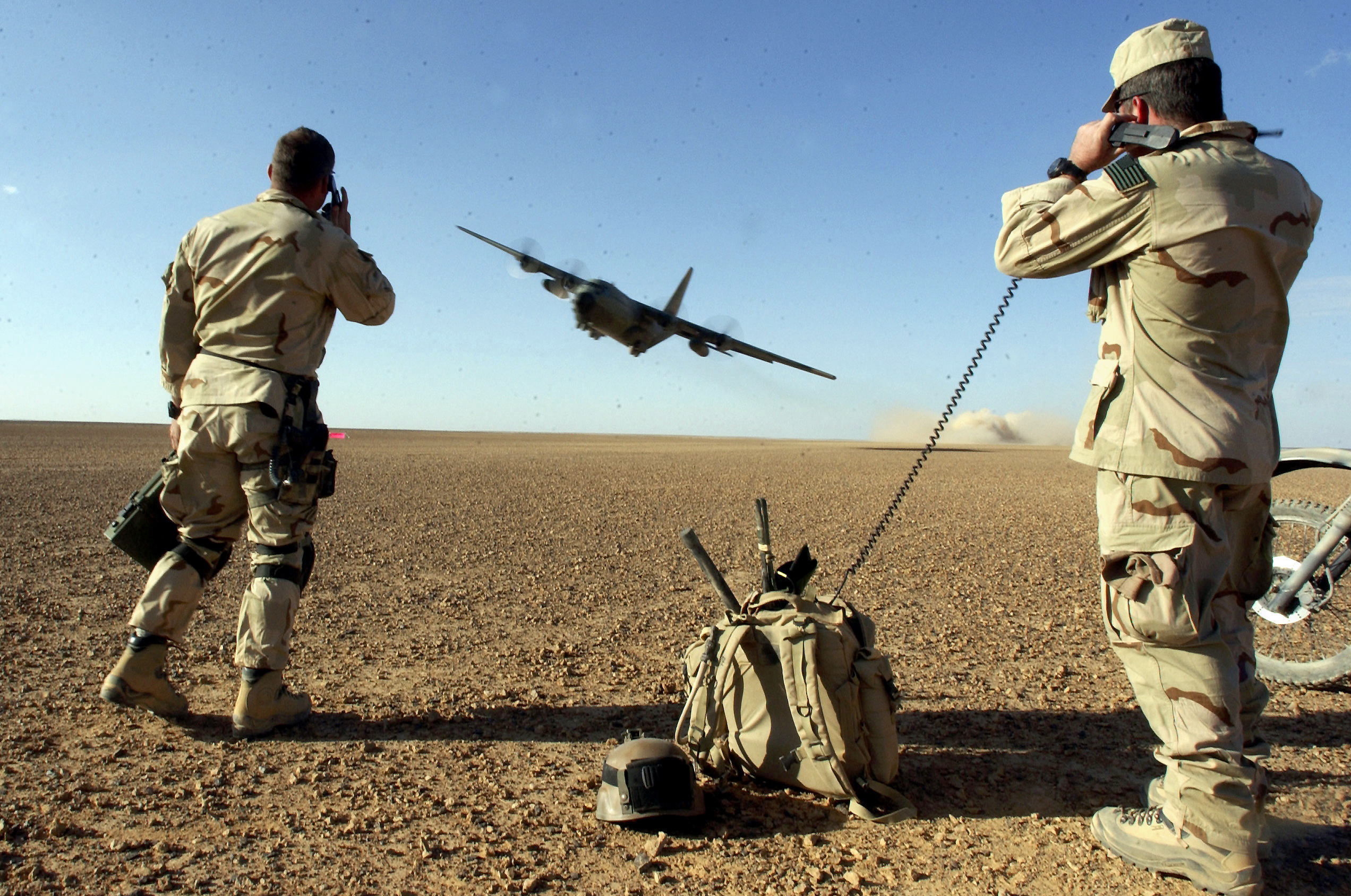
Aeronautical station of the Aeronautical mobile (OR) service in Afghanistan

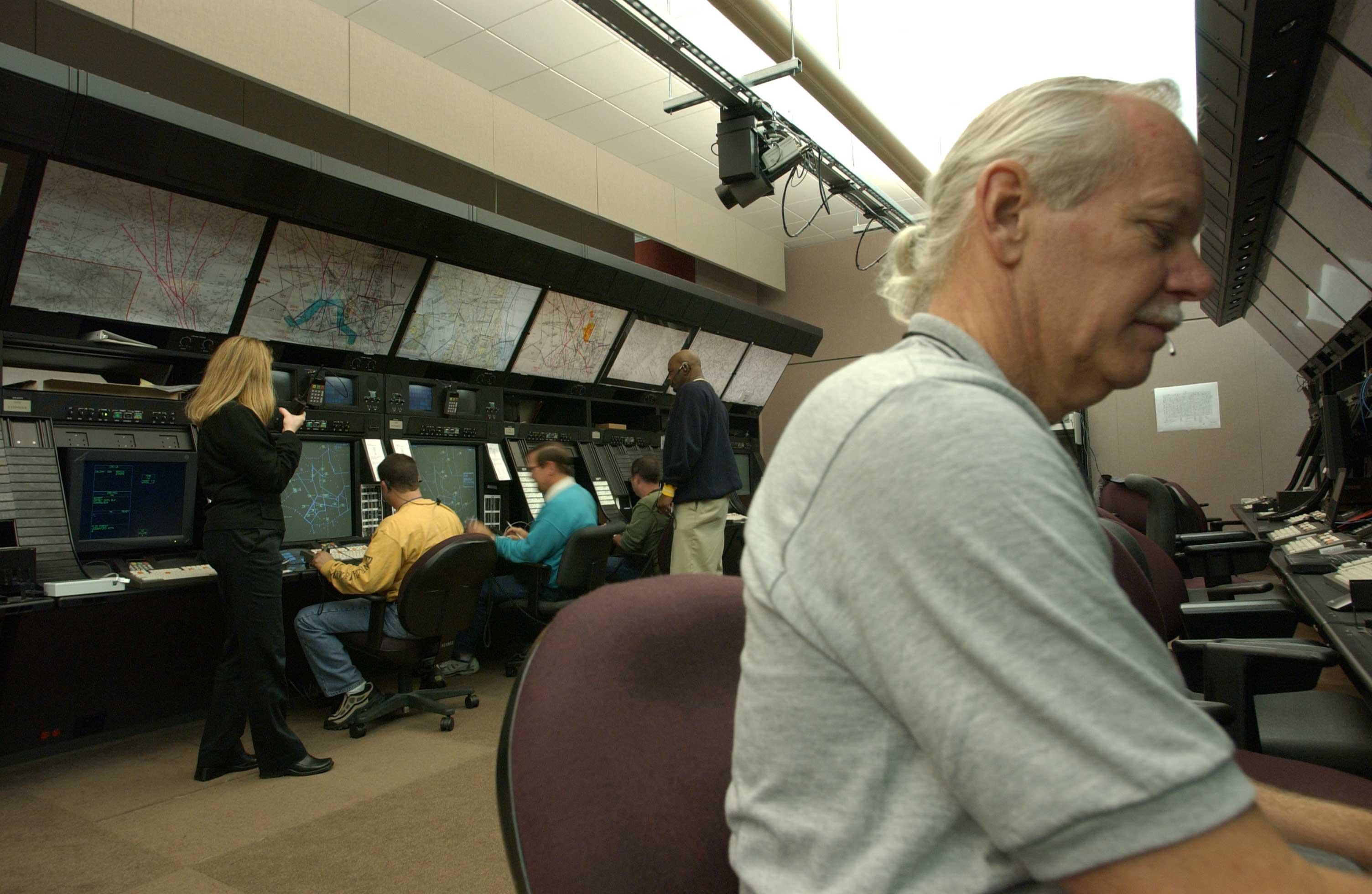
Aeronautical mobile (R) service in the Washington ARTCC

US Airways Flight 1549 record (ATC) during the emergency landing in the Hudson River

Britische VOLMET-record on HF

Aeronautical mobile service (short: AMS; also aeronautical mobile radiocommunication service) is a form of aviation communication conducted through radio. The ITU Radio Regulations divide AMS into communication used for civil air route flights (R) and off-route flights (OR). Aeronautical mobile (R) service is a so-called safety-of-life service, must be protected for interferences, and is an essential part of air traffic control. Communication occurs between radio stations onboard aircraft, termed aircraft stations, and terrestrial stations that are sometimes termed "aeronautical stations". Communication can also occur between aircraft. AMS is commonly used in air traffic control.

== Aeronautical mobile satellite service ==
Principle of aeronautical mobile satellite service

Aeronautical mobile satellite service (AMSS) is a form of AMS where an aircraft station is connected to a communications satellite. It is useful in situations where the aircraft is far away from any radio station on land.

== Frequency allocation ==
The allocation of radio frequencies is provided according to Article 5 of the ITU Radio Regulations (edition 2012).

In order to improve harmonisation in spectrum utilisation, the majority of service-allocations stipulated in this document were incorporated in national Tables of Frequency Allocations and Utilisations which is within the responsibility of the appropriate national administration. The allocation might be primary, secondary, exclusive, and shared.

- primary allocation: is indicated by writing in capital letters (see example below)
- secondary allocation: is indicated by small letters
- exclusive or shared utilization: is within the responsibility of administrations

However, military usage, in bands where there is civil usage, will be in accordance with the ITU Radio Regulations. In NATO countries military utilizations will be in accordance with the NATO Joint Civil/Military Frequency Agreement (NJFA).

Example of frequency allocation

Allocation to services
Region 1	Region 2	Region 3
2 850–3 155 MHz AERONAUTICAL MOBILE (R)
3 025–3 025 AERONAUTICAL MOBILE (OR)

Frequency range (shortwave)
On-Route (R)			Off-Route (OR)
2.850	–	3.025 MHz	3.025	–	3.155 MHz
3.4	–	3.5 MHz	3.5	–	3.95 MHz
4.65	–	4.7 MHz	4.7	–	4.85 MHz
5.45	–	5.48 MHz	5.45	–	5.48 MHz
5.48	–	5.68 MHz	5.48	–	5.73 MHz
6.525	–	6.685 MHz	6.685	–	6.765 MHz
8.815	–	8.965 MHz	8.965	–	9.04 kHz
10.005	–	10.1 MHz	11.175	–	11.275 MHz
11.275	–	11.4 MHz	13.2	–	13.26 MHz
13.26	–	13.36 MHz	15.01	–	15.1 MHz
17.9	–	17.97 MHz	17.97	–	18.03 MHz
21.924	–	22 MHz	23.2	–	23.35 MHz

== See also ==
- Radio station
- Radiocommunication service

== Sources ==
- International Telecommunication Union (ITU)
