= Space radio station =

Radio station operating outside of Earth's atmosphere

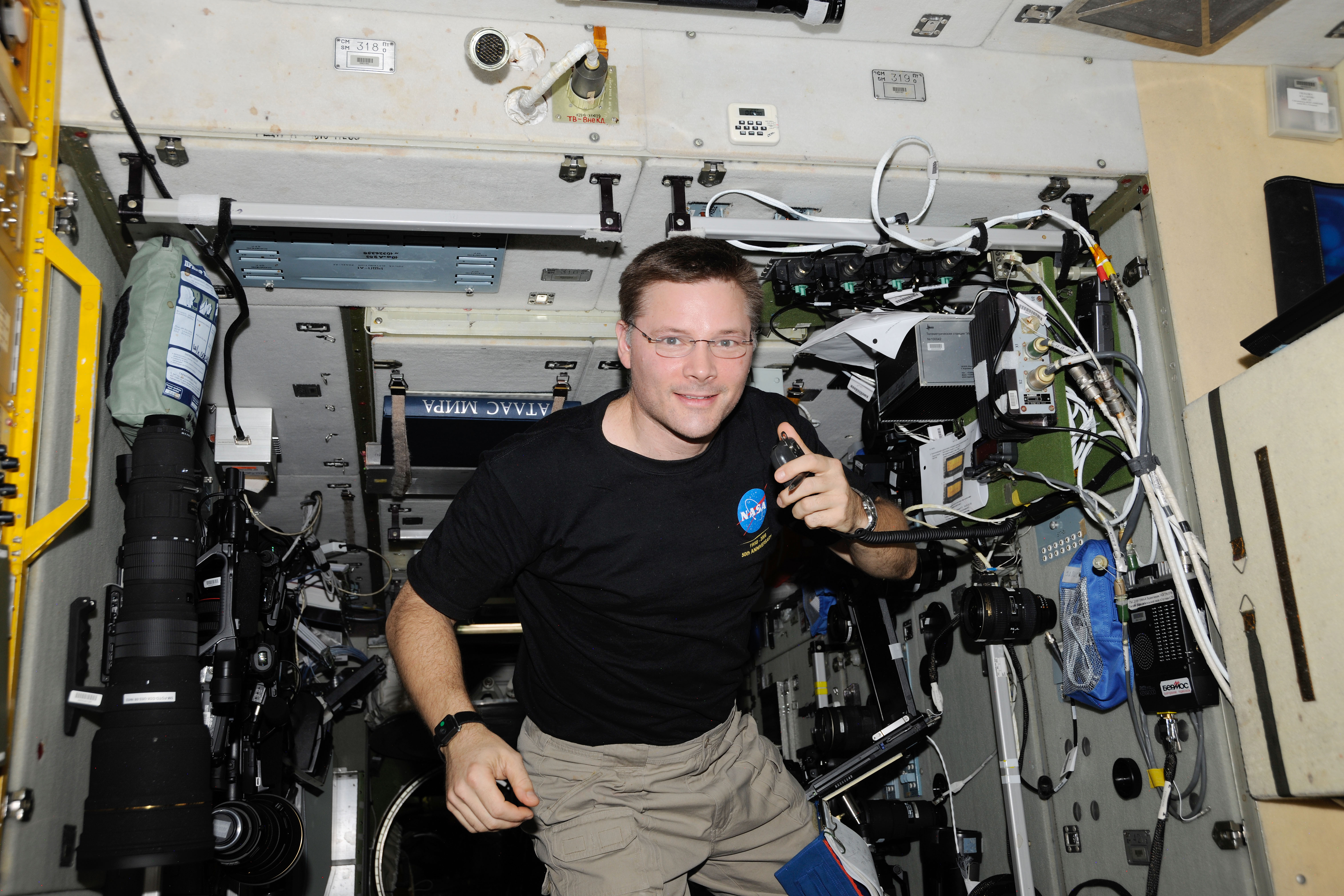
Amateur station of the amateur satellite service aboard the ISS.

A space radio station (short: space station) is a radio station located on an object travelling beyond the major portion of the Earth's atmosphere. Each station shall be classified by the service in which it operates permanently or temporarily. However, most spacecraft communicate by this means.

== See also ==
- Earth exploration-satellite service
- Earth station

== References / sources ==
- International Telecommunication Union (ITU)
