= ITU Radio Regulations =

Treaty

Basic data
Short title:	ITU Radio Regulations
Long title:	Radio Regulations of the International Telecommunication Union
Type:	Treaty
Legal status:	International law
Jurisdiction:	international
Abbreviation:	RR
Treaty countries:	ca. 200
Announcement:	December 22, 1992
Current version:	"Edition of 2024"

The ITU Radio Regulations (RR) is a basic document of the International Telecommunication Union (ITU) that regulates on law of nations scale radiocommunication services and the utilisation of radio frequencies. It is the supplementation to the ITU Constitution and Convention and in line with the ITU International Telecommunication Regulations (ITR). The ITU RR comprise and regulate the part of the allocated electromagnetic spectrum (also: radio frequency spectrum) from 9 kHz to 300 GHz.

== Structure ==
The current approved version of the ITU Radio Regulations (addition 2012) is structured as follows:

Volume 1 – Articles

- CHAPTER I – Terminology and technical characteristics
  - Section I – General terms (article 1.1-1.15)
  - Section II – Specific terms related to frequency management (article 1.16-1.18)
  - Section III – Radiocommunication services (article 1.19-1.60)
  - Section IV – Radio stations and systems (article 1.61-1.115)
  - Section V – Operational terms (article 1.116-1.136)
  - Section VI – Characteristics of Emissions and Radio Equipment (article 1.137-1.165)
  - Section VII – Frequency Sharing (article 1.166-1.176)
  - Section VIII – Technical terms relating to space (article 1.177-1.191)
- CHAPTER II – Frequencies
- CHAPTER III – Coordination, notification and recording of frequency assignments and Plan modifications
- CHAPTER IV – Interferences
- CHAPTER V – Administrative provisions
- CHAPTER VI – Provisions for services and stations
- CHAPTER VII – Distress and safety communications
- CHAPTER VIII – Aeronautical services
- CHAPTER IX – Maritime services
- CHAPTER X – Provisions for entry into force of the Radio Regulations

Volume 2 – Appendices
Volume 3 – Resolutions and Recommendations
Volume 4 – ITU-R Recommendations incorporated by reference
Maps to be used in relation to Appendix 27

== Definitions ==
The Radio Regulations define:

- the allocation of different frequency bands to different radiocommunication services;
- the mandatory technical parameters to be observed by radio stations, especially transmitters;
- procedures for the coordination (ensuring technical compatibility) and notification (formal recording and protection in the Master International Frequency Register) of frequency assignments made to radio stations by national governments;
- other procedures and operational provisions.

=== Service types ===
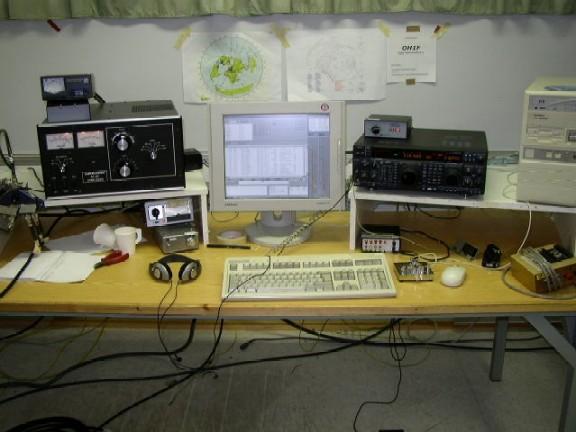
A radio station of amateur service

Radio communication services (or sradiocommunication services) (Note: Definition according to Article 1, No. 1.19 of the International Telecommunication Union's Radio Regulations (ITU-RR),: "a service ... involving the transmission, emission and/or reception of radio waves for specific telecommunication purposes".) are sub-divided into space-based radiocommunication, involving the use of one or more space stations or the use of one or more reflecting satellites or other objects in space; and terrestrial radiocommunication, which excludes space radiocommunication and radio astronomy.

The ITU Radio Regulations sets out the definitions of some 40 radio services including such services as the fixed service, the mobile service, the land mobile service, the broadcasting service, the standard frequency and time signal service, various satellite services. Further sub-sets of some of these internationally defined services are often created at the national level. For example, within the land mobile service, a country may choose to define such services as paging, dispatch two-way radio service, cellular mobile telephone service, trunked mobile radio service, etc. Many of these definitions are based upon the nature of the service being provided rather than the international concept of a radiocommunication service. In other words, the term "service" can be used in these two different ways. No matter what definitions are adopted in a given country, with some specific exceptions which are allowed for in the ITU RRs, the use of the spectrum must fit in with the international definitions of radio services.

ITU RR radiocommunication services
N°	Description	Short
1.19	Radiocommunication service	
1.20	Fixed service	fixed
1.20	obsolete ~~Aeronautical fixed service~~	
1.21	Fixed-satellite service	FSS
1.22	Inter-satellite service	ISS
1.23	Space operation service	SOS
1.24	Mobile service	mobile
1.25	Mobile-satellite service	MSS
1.26	Land mobile service	LMS
1.27	Land mobile-satellite service	LMSS
1.28	Maritime mobile service	MMS
1.29	Maritime mobile-satellite service	MMSS
1.30	Port operations service	POS
1.31	Ship movement service	SMS
1.32	Aeronautical mobile service	AMS
1.33	Aeronautical mobile (R) service	AMS(R)
1.34	Aeronautical mobile (OR) service	AMS(OR)
1.35	Aeronautical mobile-satellite service	AMSS
1.36	Aeronautical mobile-satellite (R) service	AMS(R)S
1.37	Aeronautical mobile-satellite (OR) service	AMS(OR)S
1.38	Broadcasting service	BS
1.39	Broadcasting-satellite service	BSS
1.40	Radiodetermination service	RDS
1.41	Radiodetermination-satellite service	DRSS
1.42	Radionavigation service	RNS
1.43	Radionavigation-satellite service	RNSS
1.44	Maritime radionavigation service	MRNS
1.45	Maritime radionavigation-satellite service	MRNSS
1.46	Aeronautical radionavigation service	ARNS
1.47	Aeronautical radionavigation-satellite service	ARNSS
1.48	Radiolocation service	RLS
1.49	Radiolocation-satellite service	RLSS
1.50	Meteorological aids service	
1.51	Earth exploration-satellite service	EESS
1.52	Meteorological-satellite service	
1.53	Standard frequency and time signal service	SFTS
1.54	Standard frequency and time signal-satellite service	SFTSS
1.55	Space research service	SRS
1.56	Amateur service	Amateur
1.57	Amateur-satellite service	Amateur-satellite
1.58	Radio astronomy service	RAS
1.59	Safety service	
1.60	Special radio service	

== Update ==
The drafting, revision and adoption of the Radio Regulations is the responsibility of the World Radiocommunication Conferences (WRCs) of the ITU, meetings of which are typically held every three or four years.

Recent WRCs are:

- Geneva, 1995 (WRC-95)
- Geneva, 1997 (WRC-97)
- Istanbul, 2000 (WRC-2000)
- Geneva, 2003 (WRC-03)
- Geneva, 2007 (WRC-07)
- Geneva, 2012 (WRC-12)
- Geneva, 2015 (WRC-15)
- Sharm el-Sheikh, 2019 (WRC-19)

The most recent published version of the Radio Regulations, the "Edition of 2016" contains the complete texts of the Radio Regulations as adopted and revised by WRC-15, including all articles, appendices, resolutions, and a subset of the recommendations issued by ITU-R (previously known as the CCIR) (those "recommendations" which have a mandatory nature, as a result of being cited in the Radio Regulations).

The "Edition of 2020", adopted and reviewed by the WRC-19, is scheduled for publication in October 2020.
