= Submillimeter amateur radio =

Amateur radio frequency region

Submillimeter amateur radio refers to Amateur radio activity in the sub-millimeter region (275 GHz to 30 THz) of the electromagnetic spectrum. While no international frequency allocations exist for amateur radio in the sub-millimeter region, a number of administrations permit radio amateurs to experiment on Terahertz frequencies. Amateurs who operate in the region must design and construct their own equipment, and those who do, often attempt to set communication distance records on sub-millimeter frequencies.

== ITU Radio Regulations ==
In the ITU Table of Frequency Allocations, no formal allocation to any radio service is present above 275 GHz, although the regulations themselves cover up to 3,000 GHz (3 THz). However, a number of administrations permit amateur radio experimentation within the 275–3,000 GHz range on a national basis, under license conditions that are usually based on RR5.565.

In ITU Radio Regulations, the range 275 – 3,000 GHz whilst not formally allocated, is subject to footnote 5.565; this was last revised by WRC-12 and the current version is below:

5.565 The following frequency bands in the range 275-1,000 GHz are identified for use by administrations for passive service applications:

- Radio astronomy service:

275–323 GHz, 327–371 GHz, 388–424 GHz, 426–442 GHz,
453–510 GHz, 623–711 GHz, 795–909 GHz and 926–945 GHz;

- Earth exploration-satellite service (passive) and space research service (passive):

275–286 GHz, 296–306 GHz, 313–356 GHz, 361–365 GHz, 369–392 GHz, 397–399 GHz, 409–411 GHz,
416–434 GHz, 439–467 GHz, 477–502 GHz, 523–527 GHz, 538–581 GHz, 611–630 GHz,
634–654 GHz, 657–692 GHz, 713–718 GHz, 729–733 GHz, 750–754 GHz, 771–776 GHz,
823–846 GHz, 850–854 GHz, 857–862 GHz, 866–882 GHz, 905–928 GHz, 951–956 GHz,
968–973 GHz and 985–990 GHz.

The use of the range 275–1,000 GHz by the passive services does not preclude use of this range by active services. Administrations wishing to make frequencies in the 275–1,000 GHz range available for active service applications are urged to take all practicable steps to protect these passive services from harmful interference until the date when the Table of Frequency Allocations is established in the above-mentioned 275–1,000 GHz frequency range.

All frequencies in the range 1,000–3,000 GHz may be used by both active and passive services (WRC-12)

== Germany ==
The current frequency plan for German amateurs includes that frequency ranges 444 – 453 GHz, 510 – 546 GHz, 711 – 730 GHz, 909 – 926 GHz, 945 – 951 GHz and frequencies above 956 GHz can be used by the amateur radio service.

== United Kingdom ==
In October 2016, the UK regulator Ofcom made available a licence variation available to Full licensees for a series of bands within the 275–3,000 GHz range. Applications for this can be obtained online via the RSGB website, which also provides guidance on its use and the 20 km protective radii around UK radio telescope sites.

== United States ==
FCC rule §97.301 permits amateurs use of frequencies above 275 GHz, subject to rule §97.303 Clause-f which requires:

Not causing harmful interference to radio astronomy stations: 275–323 GHz, 327–371 GHz, 388–424 GHz, 426–442 GHz, 453–510 GHz, 623–711 GHz, 795–909 GHz, or 926–945 GHz.

In addition, amateur stations transmitting in the following segments must not cause harmful interference to stations in the Earth exploration-satellite service (passive) or the space research service (passive): 275–277 GHz, 294–306 GHz, 316–334 GHz, 342–349 GHz, 363–365 GHz, 371–389 GHz, 416–434 GHz, 442–444 GHz, 496–506 GHz, 546–568 GHz, 624–629 GHz, 634–654 GHz, 659–661 GHz, 684–692 GHz, 730–732 GHz, 851–853 GHz, or 951–956 GHz.

== Distance records ==
Due to the very high atmospheric absorption at submillimeter frequencies, it is difficult to establish communications over appreciable distances; however, a few radio amateurs have set distance records in the submillimeter range.

The first recognized distance record was set by German stations DB6NT and DL1JIN on January 6, 1998. They achieved a distance of 0.05 kilometres (0.031 mi) on 411 GHz, using SSB voice transmissions.

On March 4, 2003, US stations WA1ZMS and W4WWQ set a new distance record of 1.4 kilometres (0.87 mi) on 322 GHz, using wide-band frequency modulation.

WA1ZMS and W4WWQ later set another record of 1.42 kilometres (0.88 mi) on 403 GHz using CW (Morse code) on December 21, 2004.

In Australia, a distance record on 324 GHz of 0.025 kilometres (0.016 mi) was set by stations VK3KH and VK3XPD on August 21, 2011. On November 8, 2020, a distance record on 30 THz of 0.060 kilometres (0.037 mi) was set by stations VK3CV and VK3LN.

In the UK, the current focus of activity is at 288 GHz where G8CUB and G0FDZ have progressively increased distances beyond 600m since their first two-way contact on August 2, 2019.

| Range | Band | ITU Region 1 | ITU Region 2 | ITU Region 3 |
|---|---|---|---|---|
| LF | 2200 m | 135.7–137.8 kHz | | |
| MF | 630 m | 472–479 kHz | | |
| MF | 160 m | 1.810–1.850 MHz | 1.800–2.000 MHz | |
| HF | 80 / 75 m | 3.500–3.800 MHz | 3.500–4.000 MHz | 3.500–3.900 MHz |
| HF | 60 m | 5.3515–5.3665 MHz | | |
| HF | 40 m | 7.000–7.200 MHz | 7.000–7.300 MHz | 7.000–7.200 MHz |
| HF | 30 m^{[t2]} | 10.100–10.150 MHz | | |
| HF | 20 m | 14.000–14.350 MHz | | |
| HF | 17 m^{[t2]} | 18.068–18.168 MHz | | |
| HF | 15 m | 21.000–21.450 MHz | | |
| HF | 12 m^{[t2]} | 24.890–24.990 MHz | | |
| HF | 10 m | 28.000–29.700 MHz | | |
| VHF | 8 m^{[t3]} | 40.000–40.700 MHz | —N/a | |
| VHF | 6 m | 50.000–52.000 MHz (50.000–54.000 MHz)^{[t4]} | 50.000–54.000 MHz | |
| VHF | 5 m^{[t3]} | 58.000–60.100 MHz | —N/a | |
| VHF | 4 m^{[t3]} | 70.000–70.500 MHz | —N/a | |
| VHF | 2 m | 144.000–146.000 MHz | 144.000–148.000 MHz | |
| VHF | 1.25 m | —N/a | 220.000–225.000 MHz | —N/a |
| UHF | 70 cm | 430.000–440.000 MHz | 430.000–440.000 MHz (420.000–450.000 MHz)^{[t4]} | |
| UHF | 33 cm | —N/a | 902.000–928.000 MHz | —N/a |
| UHF | 23 cm | 1.240–1.300 GHz | | |
| UHF | 13 cm | 2.300–2.450 GHz | | |
| SHF | 9 cm | 3.400–3.475 GHz^{[t4]} | 3.300–3.500 GHz | |
| SHF | 5 cm | 5.650–5.850 GHz | 5.650–5.925 GHz | 5.650–5.850 GHz |
| SHF | 3 cm | 10.000–10.500 GHz | | |
| SHF | 1.2 cm | 24.000–24.250 GHz | | |
| EHF | 6 mm | 47.000–47.200 GHz | | |
| EHF | 4 mm^{[t4]} | 75.500 GHz^{[t3]} – 81.500 GHz | 76.000–81.500 GHz | |
| EHF | 2.5 mm | 122.250–123.000 GHz | | |
| EHF | 2 mm | 134.000–141.000 GHz | | |
| EHF | 1 mm | 241.000–250.000 GHz | | |
| THF | Sub-mm | Some administrations have authorized spectrum for amateur use in this region; others have declined to regulate frequencies above 300 GHz. | | |
| [t1] | All allocations are subject to variation by country. For simplicity, only common allocations found internationally are listed. See a band's article for specifics. | | | |
| [t2] | HF allocation created at the 1979 World Administrative Radio Conference. These are commonly called the "WARC bands". | | | |
| [t3] | This is not mentioned in the ITU's Table of Frequency Allocations, but many individual administrations have commonly adopted this allocation under "Article 4.4". | | | |
| [t4] | This includes a currently active footnote allocation mentioned in the ITU's Table of Frequency Allocations. These allocations may only apply to a group of countries. | | | |
See also: Radio spectrum, Electromagnetic spectrum
