= Channel (broadcasting) =

Designation for a radio broadcasting frequency

In broadcasting, a channel or frequency channel is a designated radio frequency (or, equivalently, wavelength), assigned by a competent frequency assignment authority for the operation of a specific radio station, television station, or television channel.

== See also ==
- Frequency allocation, ITU RR, article 1.17
- Frequency assignment, ITU RR, article 1.18
- Broadcast law
- Television channel frequencies
