= FM broadcasting in the United Kingdom =

Aspect of British radio

FM sound broadcasting began in the United Kingdom on 2 May 1955 when the BBC started an FM broadcasting service the Light Programme, the Third Programme and the Home Service to the south east of England. There are now over 40 BBC and over 250 commercial FM sound broadcasting stations in the United Kingdom.

== BBC ==
The BBC began using FM sound broadcasting in 1955, but at that time AM sound broadcasting predominated. The BBC's 'popular music' station, BBC Radio 1, opened in 1967 but only broadcast on MW until the end of the 1980s, and had 'borrowed' BBC Radio 2's FM frequencies for approximately 24 hours each week. 1987 saw the switch on of Radio 1's first full time FM frequency, and in 1995, FM coverage of Radio 1 matched that of the other BBC national stations that also aired on FM. During the start of this period, Radio 1 had gradually reducing at the end of the 1980s until the final 'borrow' took place in March 1990, five months before Radio 2 became the BBC's first FM-only service when on 27 August 1990, BBC Radio 5 began broadcasting on Radio 2's MW frequencies. Radio 1 ended medium wave broadcasting in 1994 when the FM transmitter roll-out was almost complete.

Currently, with the exception of BBC Radio 5 Live, all of the BBC's national analogue services are provided on FM, although Radio 4 simulcasts its broadcasts on long wave and some Local Radio stations also still broadcast opt-outs on medium wave. BBC policy was to refer to FM as VHF on air until 30 September 1984 when FM became its official term.

== Commercial broadcasting ==
Legal commercial broadcasting began in the United Kingdom in 1973, with the launch of LBC, though offshore pirate radio stations operated in the 1960s to 1990s, usually from ships anchored off the coast of Britain.

Early licences were granted to wide-area stations, such as Capital Radio which served London and the home counties. Later more local stations were introduced. There is also one national commercial radio station, Classic FM.

Commercial radio stations simulcasted on both FM and medium waves from the beginning until the IBA asked radio stations to end the practice and from 1988 stations began to offer separate stations on each waveband. Typically another service, often a 'gold' format, was introduced on AM and the original service continued on FM.

== Frequency utilisation ==
From 1955 the band 88.0 – 94.6 MHz was used (allotted and assigned) for three BBC national networks. Over the next 40 years, the band grew piecemeal to 87.5 – 108.0 MHz, allowing for five national networks and many local stations.

Until 1995, parts of the band had been used in the United Kingdom for mobile service by police, fire brigades and the fuel and power industries. These parts were reassigned to broadcasting service gradually over many years as the communications services were transferred to new equipment in other parts of the spectrum.

The current frequency allotment plan is based on an ITU agreement made in Geneva in 1984. The table below shows which kind of broadcasting transmitter stations are the main users of each part of the band. There are many exceptions. In some areas there is some commercial usage of the 'BBC local' sub bands while in Scotland, Wales and Northern Ireland the 'Radio 4' and 'BBC Local' ranges are used interchangeably. Community radio stations and RSLs tend to be fitted into any locally available position.

Sub-band (MHz)	Main usage
87.5 – 88.0	Restricted service licences
88.0 – 90.2	BBC Radio 2
90.2 – 92.4	BBC Radio 3
92.4 – 94.6	BBC Radio 4
94.6 – 96.1	BBC Local Radio
96.1 – 97.6	Independent Local Radio
97.6 – 99.8	BBC Radio 1
99.8 – 102.0	Independent National Radio (currently Classic FM)
102.0 – 103.5	Independent Local Radio
103.5 – 104.9	BBC Local Radio
104.9 – 108.0	Independent Local Radio

== Subcarriers ==
The United Kingdom permits only Radio Data System (RDS) subcarriers. RDS dynamic (changing) PS is not permitted.

== Future switch off ==
The UK government is planning for a switchover from FM to digital radio once take-up and coverage meet certain criteria. Successive governments have admitted that FM VHF Band II analogue radio would not cease until the majority use digital, so no date has been agreed. The threshold for the proportion listening to digital radio originally only included DAB but now also includes satellite, DTT and online streaming. There is a commitment to maintain community FM radio. As long as there are significant numbers of listeners on FM in the United Kingdom no government is likely to take the politically unpopular decision to turn off analogue. Support for the FM switch off in the UK is limited. In July 2020, provided the stations also broadcast on digital radio, the British Government decided to allow Ofcom to renew analogue FM and AM licences for a further ten-year period.
