= Daniel W. Bliss =

American physicist

- Born: 1966 (age 59–60); Palo Alto, California, US
- Education: Arizona State University (B.A.) University of California, San Diego (M.S., Ph.D.)
- Known for: foundational work in MIMO radar, MIMO communications, and Electromagnetic radio frequency convergence
- Awards: IEEE Warren D. White Award (2021) IEEE Fellow (2015)
- Scientific career
- Fields: wireless communications, remote sensing, signal processing, information theory, estimation theory
- Workplaces: Arizona State University MIT Lincoln Laboratory General Dynamics

Daniel W. Bliss (born 1966) is an American professor, engineer, and physicist. He is a Fellow of the IEEE and was awarded the IEEE Warren D. White award for outstanding technical advances in the art of radar engineering in 2021 for his contributions to MIMO radar, Multiple-Function Sensing and Communications Systems, and Novel Small-Scale Radar Applications. He is a professor in the School of Electrical, Computer and Energy Engineering at Arizona State University. He is also the director of the Center for Wireless Information Systems and Computational Architecture (WISCA).

He focuses on the fields of wireless communications, remote sensing, signal processing, information theory and estimation theory. He is responsible for foundational work in MIMO radar, MIMO communications, and RF convergence. He has also made contributions to biomedical anticipatory analytics.

He has also served as a member of the IEEE AESS Radar System Panel and as a Senior Editor of the IEEE Signal Processing Magazine.

== Education ==
Bliss received his bachelor's degree in electrical engineering from Arizona State University in 1989, and then went on to complete his master's and doctorate degree in physics from the University of California at San Diego under Hans Paar in 1995 and 1997 respectively. He did his graduate research in high energy physics and was stationed at Cornell University, where he worked on two-photon physics using the CLEO particle detector.

== Career ==
In 1989, Bliss was employed by General Dynamics, where he designed avionics for the Atlas-Centaur launch vehicle and also worked on particle accelerator engineering. In 1997, Bliss was employed at MIT Lincoln Laboratory, where he developed MIMO radar literature and developed an airborne GMTI MIMO radar system that demonstrated the validity of theoretical results. In 2012, he joined Arizona State University as a professor and the director of BLISS Lab. He also established the Center for Wireless Information Systems and Computational Architecture (WISCA) at ASU, where he currently serves as the director.

== Research ==
Bliss' research contributions have included system design based on information theory, detection and estimation theory, and statistical signal processing. His research has been applied to various topics such as MIMO wireless communications, MIMO radar, cognitive radios, radio network performance bounds, geolocation techniques, channel phenomenology, and signal processing and machine learning for anticipatory physiological monitoring. His research has attracted over 15,000 total citations. He has also authored two books on the field of wireless communications.

He is responsible for formative work in electronic protection, adaptive MIMO communications, MIMO radar, distributed-coherent systems, and RF convergence. He has also made contributions to medical and physiological analytics. He has made contributions to robust multiple-antenna communications including important theoretical results, multiple patents, and the development of advanced fieldable prototype systems. He has been the principal investigator on numerous programs including sponsored programs with DARPA, ONR, Google, Airbus, and others, with applications to radio, radar, and medical monitoring.
