= Earth observation satellites transmission frequencies =

The earth is constantly monitored by several satellites operating in the earth exploration-satellite service (EESS) or space research service (SRS). These artificial satellites have onboard space radio stations from which they gather data. The data is transmitted back to earth via feeder links. This article lists a number of current active Earth observation satellites and their downlink transmission frequencies.

== Frequency assignments ==
This table contains examples of downlink frequency assignments
Satellite	Frequency	Band					
Terra	8212.5 MHz	8175-8215 MHz	METEOROLOGICAL-SATELLITE SERVICE; Earth exploration-satellite service				
Aqua	8160 MHz	8025-8175 MHz	Earth exploration-satellite service				
NOAA 17,18	1707 MHz	1700-1710 MHz	Meteorological-satellite service				
ERS-2 (High rate)	8140 MHz	8025-8175 MHz	Earth exploration-satellite service				
SPOT 4,5	8253 MHz	8215-8400 MHz	Earth exploration-satellite service				
EROS A1	8150 MHz	8025-8175 MHz	Earth exploration-satellite service				
EROS A1	8250 MHz	8215-8400 MHz	Earth exploration-satellite service				
Landsat 5, 7	8212.5 MHz	8175-8215 MHz	Earth exploration-satellite service				
CBERS 2B	8103 MHz	8025-8175 MHz	Earth exploration-satellite service				
CBERS 2B	8212 MHz	8175-8215 MHz	METEOROLOGICAL-SATELLITE SERVICE; Earth exploration-satellite service	0	8321 MHz	8215-8400 MHz	Earth exploration-satellite service
CBERS 2B	SAC-C	0 MHz	0-12 MHz	Earth exploration-satellite service			

== See also ==
- List of Earth observation satellites
- Radio waves
- Frequency allocation
