= Lunar Exploration Ground Sites =

The Lunar Exploration Ground Sites, or LEGS, are several NASA space communication complexes created to support lunar exploration. They are in addition to the existing NASA Deep Space Network and the Near Earth Network. The LEGS mission is to provide direct-to earth communication and navigation services for missions operating from 36,000 kilometers (km) in the GEO to cis-Lunar and other orbits out to 2 million km. To fully support distant orbits there will be three LEGS sites roughly equally spaced around the Earth.

The existing NASA DSN is already heavily utilized, and an audit in 2023 revealed limitations of the current DSN, in particular its support of crewed and uncrewed lunar missions:

- NASA’s DSN is oversubscribed, leading to mission impacts and scheduling challenges
- Capacity limitations leading to mission impacts are expected to increase with the onset of crewed Artemis missions

LEGS will help this situation by providing additional resources explicitly for the lunar program.

The 2 million km figure arises from the International Telecommunication Union specifications, which sets aside various frequency bands for deep space and near Earth use. This standard defines "deep space" to start at a distance of 2 million km (1.2 million mi) from the Earth's surface, whereas "near space" is anything closer. Therefore LEGS will operate in the near space bands. Since the distances are considerably less than those supported by the DSN, LEGS will use 20 meter antennas, as opposed to the 34 and 70 meter antennas of the DSN.

The three stations will be White Sands Missile Range, Matjiesfontein in South Africa, and a third location in Australia at a site yet to be determined.

== See also ==
- Space Network
- Near Earth Network
- NASA Deep Space Network
- Space Communications and Navigation Program (SCaN)
