= Military spectrum management =

Every military force has a goal to ensure and have permanent access to radio frequencies to meet its vital military tasks. This is based on strategies, doctrines and different policies that military forces adhere to.

The nature of high mobility of military operations and their logistics support requires wide use with high speed capacities of voice, data and image communications, etc. Control, surveillance, reconnaissance and reporting systems play a vital role in the command and control system. Many of these requirements can be only met with the use of radio systems. The equipment of military communications adds and multiplies the power of forces. That is why the use of radio frequencies’ spectrum is evaluated as one of the preliminary conditions for successful military operations.

== Need for access ==
Despite the continuous reduction of forces, especially after the 1990s, it is seen that the military inquiries for access to radio spectrum have not decreased. This is because of the high mobility of the joint forces together with the quick reaction, increased number of missions, etc., which need more exact and timely information in all the defined regions and those unpredicted as well. Also, the equipment of military forces’ systems work in different bands and with several frequencies at the same time.

As long as the electromagnetic spectrum is evaluated as an element of the asset list and the operational electronic architecture that today’s and future forces should have, the military forces make all the efforts to get all the necessary bands of the spectrum. However, the military forces, in their activities to manage the frequencies fight with different challenges.

The technology is running fast and has brought an extended variety of user services. The success of certain applications (mobile radio-telephony, equipment with low power, digital media, various military systems, etc.) naturally has caused an increase in the needs for frequencies from the civilian and military sectors. This has often brought civil administration to have tendencies to decrease the amount of frequencies in the interest of military forces.

== Spectrum management ==
Spectrum management is complex and difficult. The terminology, legal and technical considerations, national, regional and international complex regulations and bilateral and multilateral agreements can confuse those less educated in the effort. The forces in operations often do not see the incompatibilities and interferences between systems in their own communication services and to the other systems. All of these dictate the need for specialized personnel to ensure relevant recommendations for the commanders and staffs in all the levels and to manage the spectrum. The effective continuous training of frequency administrators is an important factor in the improvement of frequency management.

=== Fulfillment ===
Based on the priority and the abilities of national security structures, comes the enforcement for the immediate and maximum fulfillment of their inquiries for electromagnetic spectrum. But, the civil administrations that manage the frequencies often do not understand and do not harmonize the spectrum requests in the benefit of national security. The developments in the national security structures do not get followed and do not get put into full consideration by them. So the military forces should be actively engaged for the definition of a clear and sole objective for the needs of spectrum in the internal and international context and also in the priority treatment in the discussions for spectrum definition. The fact of decreasing the military forces does not mean that their available spectrum should be decreased as well. The variety of operations (combat, non-combat and peace support) of military forces has increased and they usually use the frequencies based on the activities and not on the number of forces. The military equipment is designed to work using the entire traditional and harmonized military spectrum. Also, the support with frequencies is mandatory, to fulfill all the acquisition and procurement procedures.

=== Standards ===
An essential aspect in the management of frequencies is the orientation towards policies, agreements, and NATO procedures and standards. All of these should have the necessary reflection in those of military forces of one country, member or partner. This is a necessity and needs to achieve among others the interoperability between communication and information systems.

The frequency management in military forces has a dynamic nature. It is related to adjustment and implementation of time concepts for the spectrum, taking into consideration planning, allocation, and spectrum usage in accordance with systems characteristics currently available and those of the future. This implies the flexibility in the protection of frequencies that are approved in national plans of frequencies, available for military forces. Although, it looks for a time to time evaluation of the current and future needs for spectrum aiming at more exact redefinitions of spectrum resources and more effective ways of spectrum division with other non-governmental users.

=== Levels of command and control ===
The authorities of different levels of command and control have the responsibility to ensure the full support of needs with spectrum for their structures. They always need and look for more continuous support with equipment which functions with radio frequencies. But, often they do not conceive correctly and do not have the necessary knowledge for access in the necessary frequency spectrum for military tasks. That is why the specialized frequency management structures have the responsibility of developing the full necessary administrative, planning and technical activities for frequencies.

=== Prevention of interference ===
To ensure a better and interference-free usage by other users, military forces, through their corresponding structures, take care for the monitoring of the frequency bands defined for them, cooperating and exchanging data with other governmental institutions authorized for spectrum management and other non-governmental users, to identify and detect unauthorized transmissions and illegal interferences. Spectrum monitoring requires expensive equipment and qualified personnel.

=== Combined and joint operations ===
Combined and joint operations are still a major challenge for frequency managers. The cooperation of two or more forces together, with different training and organization and without appropriate frequency planning, brings failure of command, control, and communications. The realizations of combined and joint operations, in alliance or coalitions, are closely connected to communications and information systems. Frequency management is evaluated as one of the main points for communications planning. In a coalition force, where there are a huge number of countries and military forces, if there is not correct management and coordination of spectrum bands what is colloquially called "frequency fratricide" will happen. To allocate frequencies in such an operation is very difficult. The spectrum usage in these operations has more than ever showed the need for coordination between forces of different countries and with the country where they operate, rationality, standardization, and interoperability, in accordance with deployment sites, regions and national and international regulations.

=== Computer software applications ===
Effective frequency management is closely tied with computer software applications. Through these applications, the optimal administration and coordination of frequencies and fulfillment of inquiries is ensured in every situation. Such applications support centralized and decentralized management of frequencies. They provide the planning and coordination of frequencies throughout the defined bands and their effective usage. Of course, such applications have financial costs and require time for the preliminary preparation and the final implementation.

=== Policies, guides, procedures ===
The normal frequency management in military forces is based on policies, guides, procedures, organizational and technical manuals. The preparation, their harmonization with international, regional and national regulations and adherence to technological developments is a continuous task that requires time to be realized from proper military structures.

=== Technical capabilities ===
A fundamental problem in frequency allocation is the existence of technical, geographical and operational factors, which restrict frequency usage of military forces. Frequency managers have to take into consideration technical capabilities and the equipment limit for functioning of the systems in accordance with operational requirements. In case of overloaded frequency bands, the military forces are obliged to foresee some interference and to accept some damage in the normal operation of their communications systems.
