= NASA Deep Space Network =

Network of radio communication facilities run by NASA

Deep Space Network
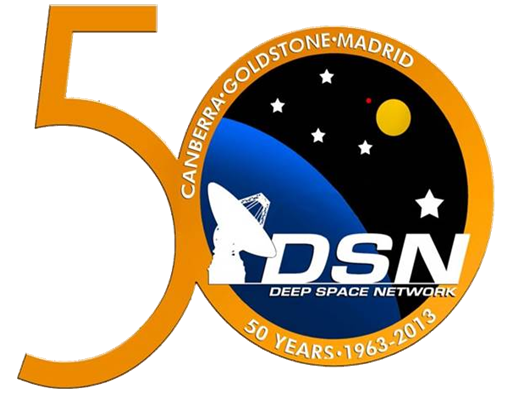
- Insignia for the Deep Space Network's 50th anniversary celebrations (1963–2013)

- Website "Deep Space Network Now"
- Alternative names: NASA Deep Space Network
- Organization: Interplanetary Network Directorate (NASA / JPL)
- Location: Pasadena, Los Angeles County, California, Pacific States Region
- Coordinates: 34°12′6.1″N 118°10′18″W
- Established: October 1, 1958; 68 years ago
- Website: information DSN Now

Telescopes
- Goldstone Deep Space Communications Complex: Barstow, California, United States
- Madrid Deep Space Communications Complex: Robledo de Chavela, Community of Madrid, Spain
- Canberra Deep Space Communication Complex: Canberra, Australian Capital Territory, Australia
- Related media on Commons

The NASA Deep Space Network (DSN) is a worldwide network of spacecraft communication ground segment facilities, located in the United States (California), Spain (Madrid), and Australia (Canberra), that supports NASA's interplanetary spacecraft missions. It also performs radio and radar astronomy observations for the exploration of the Solar System and the universe, and supports selected Earth-orbiting missions. DSN is part of the NASA Jet Propulsion Laboratory (JPL).

== General information ==
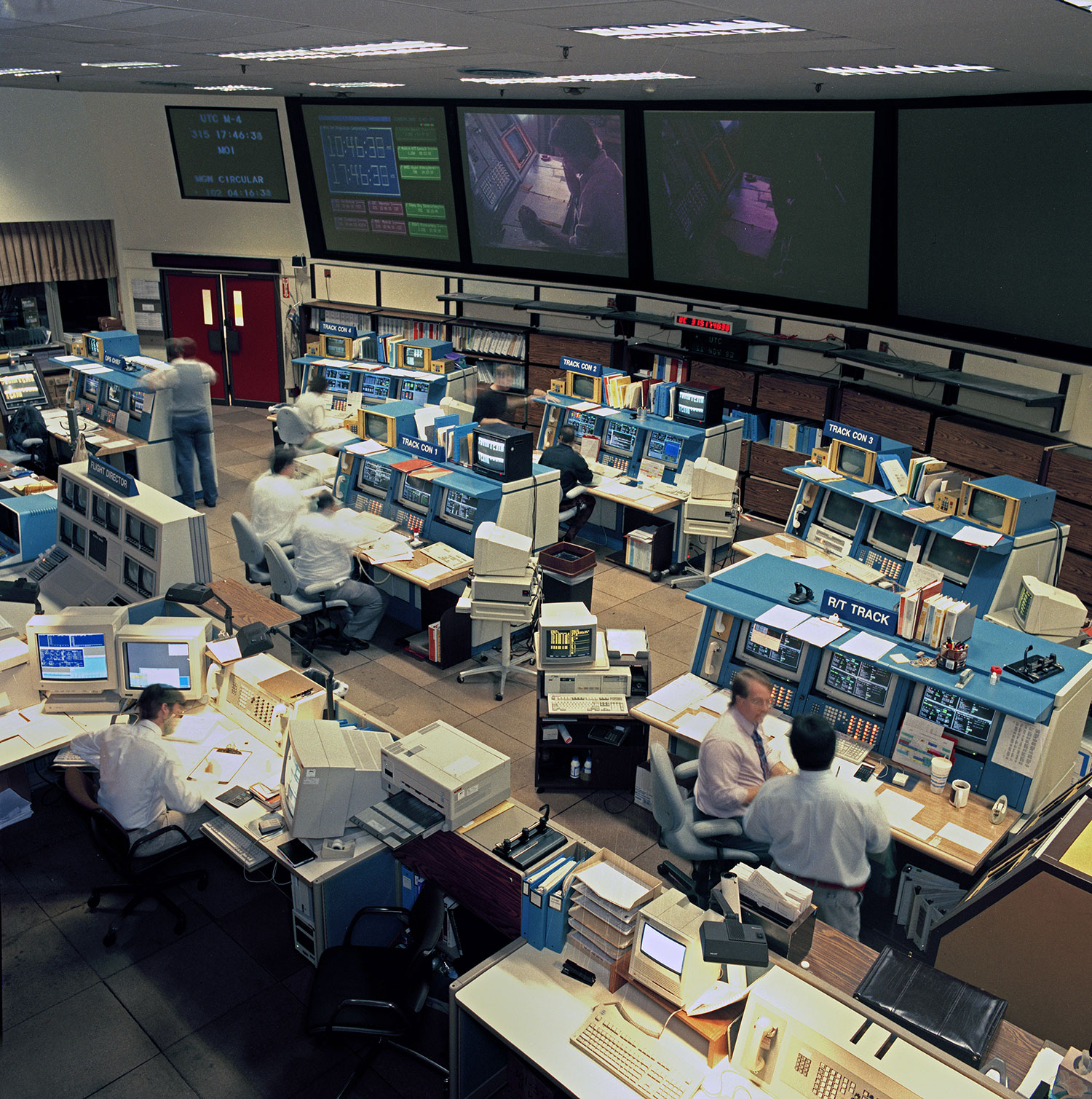
Deep Space Network Operations Center at JPL, Pasadena, California, in 1993

DSN currently consists of three deep-space communications facilities located such that a distant spacecraft is always in view of at least one station. They are:

- the Goldstone Deep Space Communications Complex (35°25′36″N 116°53′24″W) about 60 kilometres (37 mi) north of Barstow, California. For details of Goldstone's contribution to the early days of space probe tracking, see Project Space Track;
- the Madrid Deep Space Communications Complex (40°25′53″N 4°14′53″W), 60 kilometres (37 mi) west of Madrid, Spain; and
- the Canberra Deep Space Communication Complex (CDSCC) in the Australian Capital Territory (35°24′05″S 148°58′54″E), 40 kilometres (25 mi) southwest of Canberra, Australia near the Tidbinbilla Nature Reserve.

Each facility is situated in semi-mountainous, bowl-shaped terrain to help shield against radio frequency interference. The strategic placement of the stations permits constant observation of spacecraft as the Earth rotates, which helps to make the DSN the largest and most sensitive scientific telecommunications system in the world.

The DSN supports NASA's contribution to the scientific investigation of the Solar System: It provides a two-way communications link that guides and controls various NASA uncrewed interplanetary space probes, and brings back the images and new scientific information these probes collect. All DSN antennas are steerable, high-gain, parabolic reflector antennas. The antennas and data delivery systems make it possible to:

- acquire telemetry data from spacecraft.
- transmit commands to spacecraft.
- upload software modifications to spacecraft.
- track spacecraft position and velocity.
- perform Very Long Baseline Interferometry observations.
- measure variations in radio waves for radio science experiments.
- gather science data.
- monitor and control the performance of the network.

Other countries and organizations also run deep space networks. The DSN operates according to the standards of the Consultative Committee for Space Data Systems, as do most other deep space networks, and hence the DSN is able to inter-operate with the networks of other space agencies. These include the Soviet Deep Space Network, the Chinese Deep Space Network, the Indian Deep Space Network, the Japanese Deep Space Network, and the ESTRACK of the European Space Agency. These agencies often cooperate for better mission coverage. In particular, DSN has a cross-support agreement with ESA that allows mutual use of both networks for more effectiveness and reduced risk. In addition, radio astronomy facilities, such as the Parkes Observatory, the Green Bank Telescope, and the Very Large Array, are sometimes used to supplement the antennas of the DSN.

=== Operations control center ===
The antennas at all three DSN Complexes communicate directly with the Deep Space Operations Center (also known as Deep Space Network operations control center) located at the JPL facilities in Pasadena, California.

In the early years, the operations control center did not have a permanent facility. It was a provisional setup with numerous desks and phones installed in a large room near the computers used to calculate orbits. In July 1961, NASA started the construction of the permanent facility, Space Flight Operations Facility (SFOF). The facility was completed in October 1963 and dedicated on May 14, 1964. In the initial setup of the SFOF, there were 31 consoles, 100 closed-circuit television cameras, and more than 200 television displays to support Ranger 6 to Ranger 9 and Mariner 4.

Currently, the operations center personnel at SFOF monitor and direct operations, and oversee the quality of spacecraft telemetry and navigation data delivered to network users. In addition to the DSN complexes and the operations center, a ground communications facility provides communications that link the three complexes to the operations center at JPL, to space flight control centers in the United States and overseas, and to scientists around the world.

== Deep space ==
View from the Earth's north pole, showing the field of view of the main DSN antenna locations. Once a mission gets more than 30,000 km (19,000 mi) from Earth, it is always in view of at least one of the stations.

Tracking vehicles in deep space is quite different from tracking missions in low Earth orbit (LEO). Deep space missions are visible for long periods of time from a large portion of the Earth's surface, and so require few stations (the DSN has only three main sites). These few stations, however, require huge antennas, ultra-sensitive receivers, and powerful transmitters in order to transmit and receive over the vast distances involved.

Deep space is defined in several different ways. According to a 1975 NASA report, the DSN was designed to communicate with "spacecraft traveling approximately 16,000 km (10,000 miles) from Earth to the farthest planets of the solar system." JPL diagrams state that at an altitude of 30,000 km (19,000 mi), a spacecraft is always in the field of view of one of the tracking stations. The International Telecommunication Union, which sets aside various frequency bands for deep space and near Earth use, defines "deep space" to start at a distance of 2 million km (1.2 million mi) from the Earth's surface.

=== Frequency bands ===
The NASA Deep Space Network can both send and receive in all of the ITU deep space bands—S-band (2 GHz), X-band (8 GHz), and Ka-band (32 GHz). Frequency usage has in general moved upward over the life of the DSN, as higher frequencies have higher gain for the same size antenna, and the deep space bands are wider, so more data can be returned. However, higher frequencies also need more accurate pointing (on the spacecraft) and more precise antenna surfaces (on Earth), so improvements in both spacecraft and the DSN were required to move to higher bands. Early missions used S-band for both uplink and downlink. Viking (1975) had X-band as an experiment, and Voyager (1977) was the first to use it operationally. Similarly, Mars Observer (1994) carried a Ka-band experiment, Mars Reconnaissance Orbiter (2005) had a Ka-band demo, and Kepler (2009) was the first mission to use Ka-band as the primary downlink.

However, not all space missions can use these bands. The Moon, the Earth-moon Lagrange points, and the Earth–Sun Lagrangian points L_{1} and L_{2} are all closer than 2 million km from Earth (distances are here), so they are considered near space and cannot use the ITU's deep space bands. Missions at these locations that need high data rates must therefore use the "near space" K band (27 GHz). Since NASA has several such missions (such as the James Webb Space Telescope and the Lunar Reconnaissance Orbiter), they have enhanced the Deep Space Network to receive (but not transmit) at these frequencies as well.

The DSN is also pursuing optical deep space communication, offering greater communication speeds at the cost of susceptibility to weather and the need for extremely precise pointing of the spacecraft. This technology is working in prototype form.

== History ==
The forerunner of the DSN was established in January 1958, when JPL, then under contract to the US Army, deployed portable radio tracking stations in Nigeria, Singapore, and California to receive telemetry and plot the orbit of the Army-launched Explorer 1, the first successful US satellite. NASA was officially established on October 1, 1958, to consolidate the separately developing space-exploration programs of the US Army, US Navy, and US Air Force into one civilian organization.

On December 3, 1958, JPL was transferred from the US Army to NASA and given responsibility for the design and execution of lunar and planetary exploration programs using remotely controlled spacecraft. Shortly after the transfer, NASA established the concept of the Deep Space Network as a separately managed and operated communications system that would accommodate all deep space missions, thereby avoiding the need for each flight project to acquire and operate its own specialized space communications network. The DSN was given responsibility for its own research, development, and operation in support of all of its users. Under this concept, it has become a world leader in the development of low-noise receivers; large parabolic-dish antennas; tracking, telemetry, and command systems; digital signal processing; and deep space navigation. The Deep Space Network formally announced its intention to send missions into deep space on Christmas Eve 1963; it has remained in continuous operation in one capacity or another ever since.

The largest antennas of the DSN are often called on during spacecraft emergencies. Almost all spacecraft are designed so normal operation can be conducted on the smaller (and more economical) antennas of the DSN, but during an emergency the use of the largest antennas is crucial. This is because a troubled spacecraft may be forced to use less than its normal transmitter power, attitude control problems may preclude the use of high-gain antennas, and recovering every bit of telemetry is critical to assessing the health of the spacecraft and planning the recovery. The most famous example is the Apollo 13 mission, where limited battery power and inability to use the spacecraft's high-gain antennas reduced signal levels below the capability of the Manned Space Flight Network, and the use of the biggest DSN antennas (and the Australian Parkes Observatory radio telescope) was critical to saving the lives of the astronauts. While Apollo was also a US mission, DSN provides this emergency service to other space agencies as well, in a spirit of inter-agency and international cooperation. For example, the recovery of the Solar and Heliospheric Observatory (SOHO) mission of the European Space Agency (ESA) would not have been possible without the use of the largest DSN facilities.

=== DSN and the Apollo program ===
Although normally tasked with tracking uncrewed spacecraft, the Deep Space Network (DSN) also contributed to the communication and tracking of Apollo missions to the Moon, although primary responsibility was held by the Manned Space Flight Network (MSFN). The DSN designed the MSFN stations for lunar communication and provided a second antenna at each MSFN site (the MSFN sites were near the DSN sites for just this reason). Two antennas at each site were needed both for redundancy and because the beam widths of the large antennas needed were too small to encompass both the lunar orbiter and the lander at the same time. DSN also supplied some larger antennas as needed, in particular for television broadcasts from the Moon, and emergency communications such as Apollo 13.

Excerpt from a NASA report describing how the DSN and MSFN cooperated for Apollo:

Another critical step in the evolution of the Apollo Network came in 1965 with the advent of the DSN Wing concept. Originally, the participation of DSN 26-m antennas during an Apollo Mission was to be limited to a backup role. This was one reason why the MSFN 26-m sites were collocated with the DSN sites at Goldstone, Madrid, and Canberra. However, the presence of two, well-separated spacecraft during lunar operations stimulated the rethinking of the tracking and communication problem. One thought was to add a dual S-band RF system to each of the three 26-m MSFN antennas, leaving the nearby DSN 26-m antennas still in a backup role. Calculations showed, though, that a 26-m antenna pattern centered on the landed Lunar Module would suffer a 9-to-12 db loss at the lunar horizon, making tracking and data acquisition of the orbiting Command Service Module difficult, perhaps impossible. It made sense to use both the MSFN and DSN antennas simultaneously during the all-important lunar operations. JPL was naturally reluctant to compromise the objectives of its many uncrewed spacecraft by turning three of its DSN stations over to the MSFN for long periods. How could the goals of both Apollo and deep space exploration be achieved without building a third 26-m antenna at each of the three sites or undercutting planetary science missions?

The solution came in early 1965 at a meeting at NASA Headquarters, when Eberhardt Rechtin suggested what is now known as the "wing concept". The wing approach involves constructing a new section or "wing" to the main building at each of the three involved DSN sites. The wing would include a MSFN control room and the necessary interface equipment to accomplish the following:

1. Permit tracking and two-way data transfer with either spacecraft during lunar operations.
2. Permit tracking and two-way data transfer with the combined spacecraft during the flight to the Moon.
3. Provide backup for the collocated MSFN site passive track (spacecraft to ground RF links) of the Apollo spacecraft during trans-lunar and trans-earth phases.

With this arrangement, the DSN station could be quickly switched from a deep-space mission to Apollo and back again. GSFC personnel would operate the MSFN equipment completely independently of DSN personnel. Deep space missions would not be compromised nearly as much as if the entire station's equipment and personnel were turned over to Apollo for several weeks.

The details of this cooperation and operation are available in a two-volume technical report from JPL.

== Management ==
The network is a NASA facility and is managed and operated for NASA by JPL, which is part of the California Institute of Technology (Caltech). The Interplanetary Network Directorate (IND) manages the program within JPL and is charged with the development and operation of it. The IND is considered to be JPL's focal point for all matters relating to telecommunications, interplanetary navigation, information systems, information technology, computing, software engineering, and other relevant technologies. While the IND is best known for its duties relating to the Deep Space Network, the organization also maintains the JPL Advanced Multi-Mission Operations System (AMMOS) and JPL's Institutional Computing and Information Services (ICIS).

The facilities in Spain and Australia are jointly owned and operated in conjunction with that government's scientific institutions. In Australia, "the Commonwealth Scientific and Industrial Research Organisation (CSIRO), an Australian Commonwealth Government Statutory Authority, established the CSIRO Astronomy and Space Science Division to manage the day-to-day operations, engineering, and maintenance activities of the Canberra Deep Space Communications Complex". Most of the staff at Tidbinbilla are Australian government employees; the land and buildings are owned by the Australian government; NASA provides the bulk of the funding, owns the movable property (such as dishes and electronic equipment) which it has paid for, and gets to decide where to point the dishes. Similarly, in Spain, "Ingenieria de Sistemas para la Defensa de España S.A. (ISDEFE), a wholly owned subsidiary of the Instituto Nacional de Técnica Aeroespacial (INTA) and a part of the Spanish Department of Defense, operates and maintains the Madrid Deep Space Communications Complex (Madrid)".

Peraton (formerly Harris Corporation) is under contract to JPL for the DSN's operations and maintenance. Peraton has responsibility for managing the Goldstone complex, operating the DSOC, and for DSN operations, mission planning, operations engineering, and logistics.

== Antennas ==
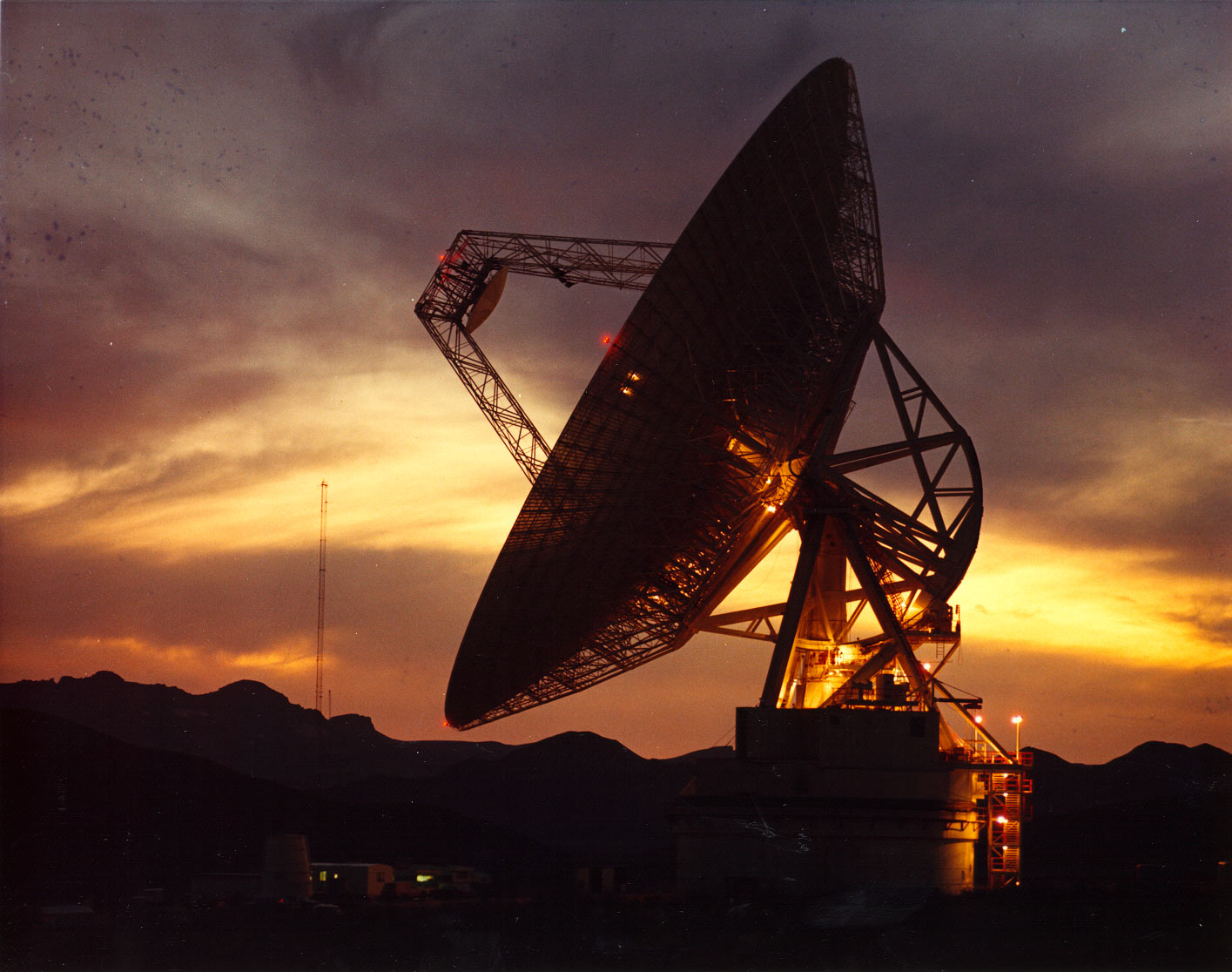
70 m antenna at Goldstone, California

Each complex consists of at least four deep space terminals equipped with ultra-sensitive receiving systems and large parabolic-dish antennas. There are:

- Three or more 34-meter (112 ft) Beam waveguide antennas (BWG)
- One 70-meter (230 ft) antenna.

Five of the 34-meter (112 ft) beam waveguide antennas were added to the system in the late 1990s. Three were located at Goldstone, and one each at Canberra and Madrid. A second 34-meter (112 ft) beam waveguide antenna (the network's sixth) was completed at the Madrid complex in 2004.

In order to meet the current and future needs of deep space communication services, a number of new Deep Space Station antennas had to be built at the existing Deep Space Network sites. At the Canberra Deep Space Communication Complex the first of these was completed in October 2014 (DSS35), with a second becoming operational in October 2016 (DSS36). A new 34-meter dish (DSS53) became operational at the Madrid complex in February 2022.

The 70 meter antennas are aging and more difficult to maintain than the modern BWG antennas. Therefore in 2012 NASA announced a plan to decommission all three of them and replace them with arrayed 34-meter BWG antennas. Each of these new antennas would be upgraded to have X-band uplink capabilities and both X and Ka-band downlink capabilities. However by 2021, NASA decided instead to do a complete refurbishment of all 70-meter antennas, requiring taking them offline for months at a time. These refurbished antennas were expected to serve for decades to come.

== Current signal processing capabilities ==
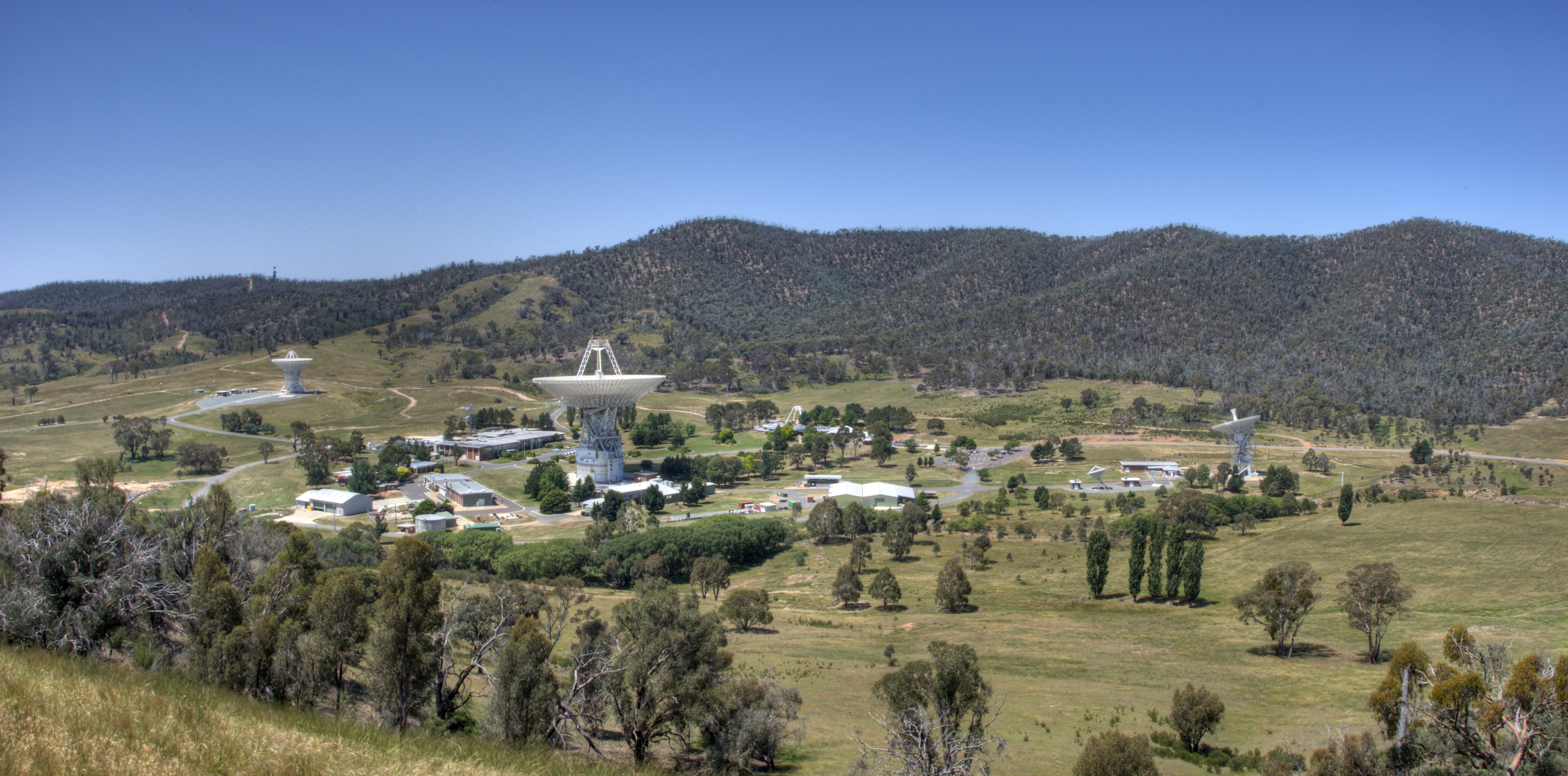
The Canberra Deep Space Communication Complex in 2008

The general capabilities of the DSN have not substantially changed since the beginning of the Voyager Interstellar Mission in the early 1990s. However, many advancements in digital signal processing, arraying and error correction have been adopted by the DSN.

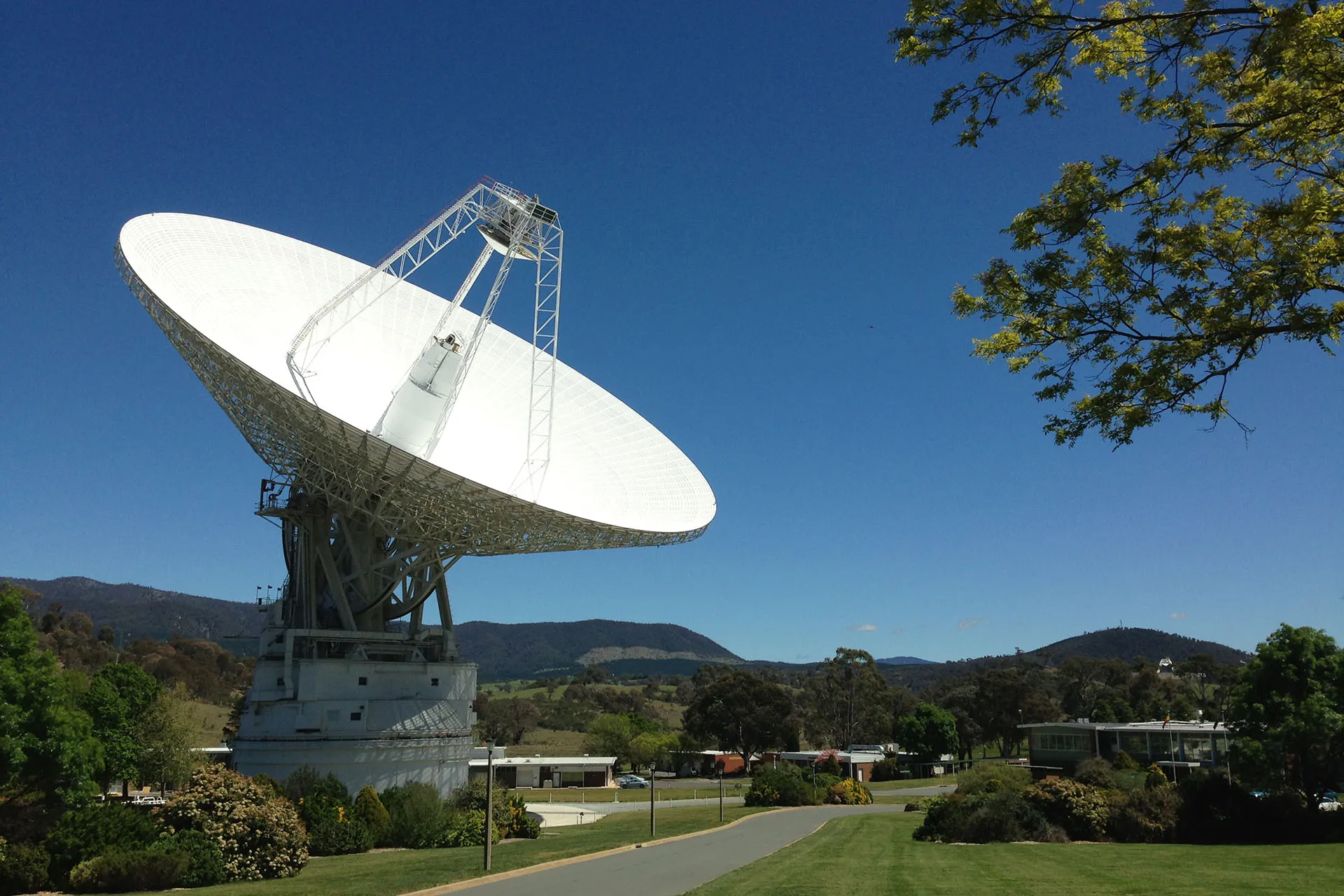
70 m antenna at Canberra, Australia

The ability to array several antennas was incorporated to improve the data returned from the Voyager 2 Neptune encounter, and extensively used for the Galileo mission, when the spacecraft's high-gain antenna failed to deploy and as a result Galileo was forced to resort to operating solely off its low-gain antennas.

The DSN array currently available since the Galileo mission can link the 70-meter (230 ft) dish antenna at the Deep Space Network complex in Goldstone, California, with an identical antenna located in Australia, in addition to two 34-meter (112 ft) antennas at the Canberra complex. The California and Australia sites were used concurrently to pick up communications with Galileo.

Arraying of antennas within the three DSN locations is also used. For example, a 70-meter (230 ft) dish antenna can be arrayed with a 34-meter dish. For especially vital missions, like Voyager 2, non-DSN facilities normally used for radio astronomy can be added to the array. In particular, the Canberra 70-meter (230 ft) dish can be arrayed with the Parkes Radio Telescope in Australia; and the Goldstone 70-meter dish can be arrayed with the Very Large Array of antennas in New Mexico. Also, two or more 34-meter (112 ft) dishes at one DSN location are commonly arrayed together.

All the stations are remotely operated from a centralized Signal Processing Center at each complex. These Centers house the electronic subsystems that point and control the antennas, receive and process the telemetry data, transmit commands, and generate the spacecraft navigation data. Once the data are processed at the complexes, they are transmitted to JPL for further processing and for distribution to science teams over a modern communications network.

Especially at Mars, there are often many spacecraft within the beam width of an antenna. For operational efficiency, a single antenna can receive signals from multiple spacecraft at the same time. This capability is called Multiple Spacecraft Per Aperture, or MSPA. Currently, the DSN can receive up to 4 spacecraft signals at the same time, or MSPA-4. However, apertures cannot currently be shared for uplink. When two or more high-power carriers are used simultaneously, very high order intermodulation products fall in the receiver bands, causing interference to the much (25 orders of magnitude) weaker received signals. Therefore, only one spacecraft at a time can get an uplink, though up to 4 can be received.

== Network limitations and challenges ==
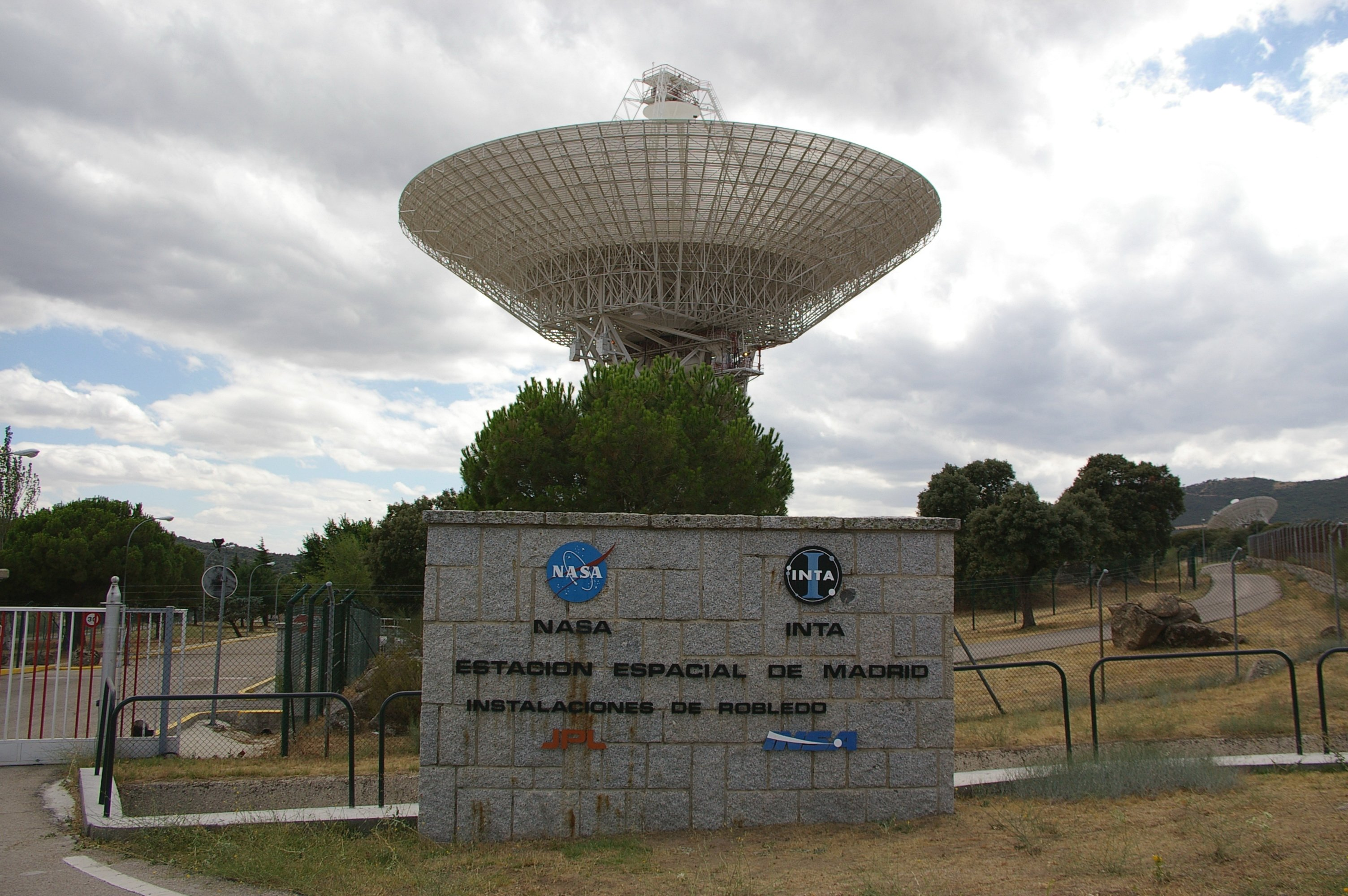
70 m antenna at Robledo de Chavela, Spain

There are a number of limitations to the current DSN, and a number of challenges going forward. Most of these are outlined in a 2023 Audit of NASA's Deep Space Network performed by NASA's Office of Inspector General. Their main conclusions are:

- NASA's DSN is oversubscribed, leading to mission impacts and scheduling challenges
- Capacity limitations leading to mission impacts are expected to increase with the onset of crewed Artemis missions
- Capacity limitations, lack of readily available backups, and laborious process present challenges to scheduling time on DSN
- Upgrades to NASA's Deep Space Network are behind schedule and more costly than planned
- Challenges with international partners and project oversight

Other problems have been noted as well:

- The Deep Space Network nodes are all on Earth. Therefore, data transmission rates from/to spacecraft and space probes are severely constrained due to the distances from Earth. For now it can connect with the Mars orbiters in the Mars Relay Network for faster and more flexible communications with spacecraft and landers on Mars. Adding dedicated communication satellites elsewhere in space, to handle multiparty, multi-mission use, such as the planned Mars Telecommunications Network, would increase flexibility towards some sort of Interplanetary Internet.
- The need to support "legacy" missions that have remained operational beyond their original lifetimes but are still returning scientific data. Programs such as Voyager have been operating long past their original mission termination date. They also need some of the largest antennas.
- Replacing major components, and/or accidents, can leave an antenna out of service for months or years at a time.
- Some DSN capabilities, such as the Goldstone Solar System Radar, are only available on one antenna. When that antenna is out of service or unavailable, the capability is lost.
- The older 70 m antennas are reaching the end of their lives, and at some point will need to be replaced. NASA has so far extended their lives through major refurbishment. The leading candidate for 70 m replacement had been an array of smaller dishes, but more recently the decision was taken to expand the provision of 34-meter (112 ft) BWG antennas at each complex to a total of 4. All the 34-meter HEF antennas have been replaced.

Because of capacity limits on the DSN, new spacecraft intended for missions beyond geocentric orbits are being equipped to use the beacon mode service, which allows such missions to operate without the DSN most of the time. In addition, NASA is creating a network of Lunar Exploration Ground Sites to offload much of the lunar and Artemis mission needs from the DSN.

== DSN and radio science ==
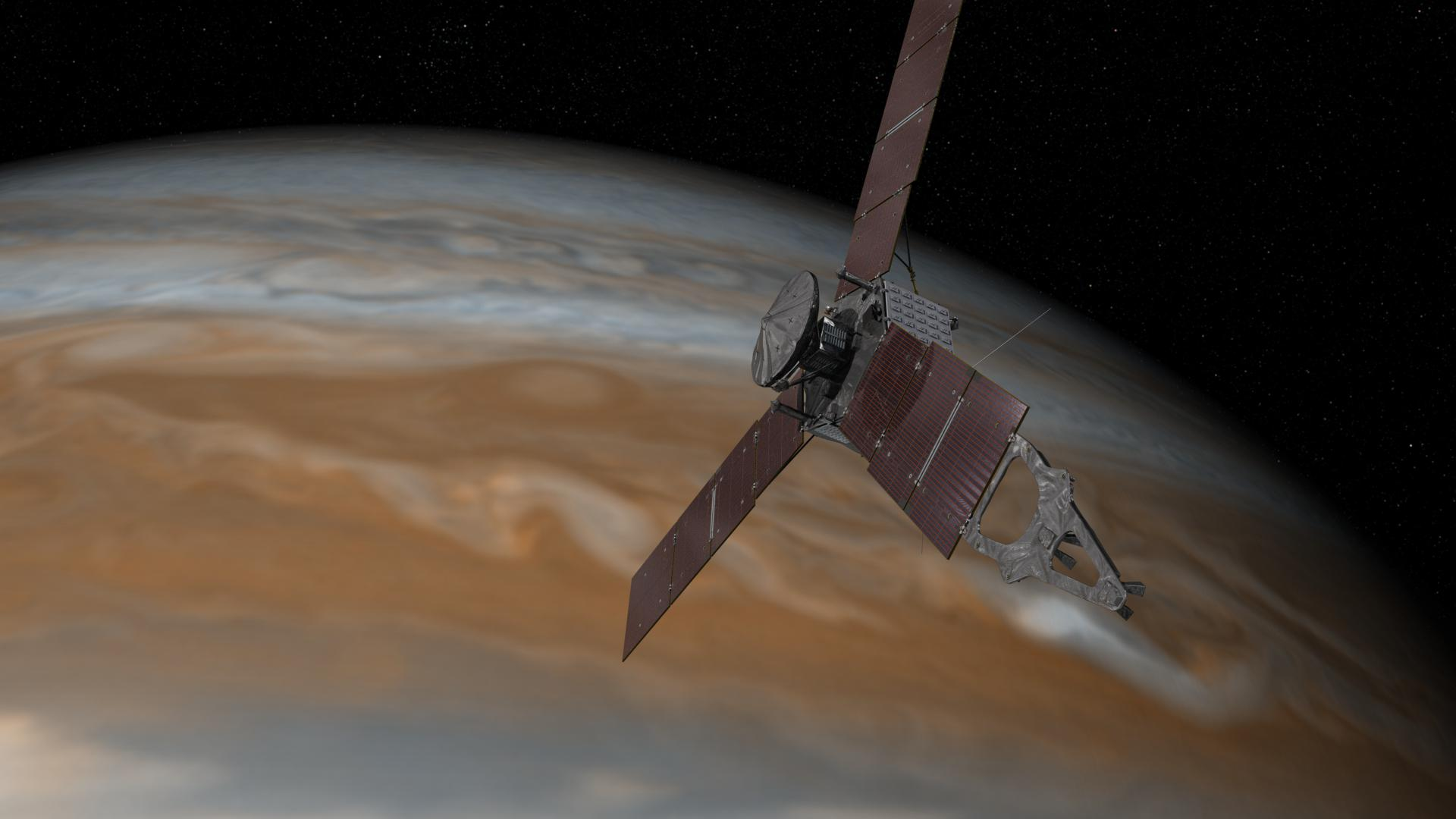
Illustration of Juno and Jupiter. Juno is in a polar orbit that takes it close to Jupiter as it passes from north to south, getting a view of both poles. During the GS experiment it must point its antenna at the Deep Space Network on Earth to pick up a special signal sent from DSN.

The DSN forms one portion of the radio sciences experiment included on most deep space missions, where radio links between spacecraft and Earth are used to investigate planetary science, space physics and fundamental physics. The experiments include radio occultations, gravity field determination and celestial mechanics, bistatic scattering, doppler wind experiments, solar corona characterization, and tests of fundamental physics.

For example, the Deep Space Network forms one component of the gravity science experiment on Juno. This includes special communication hardware on Juno and uses its communication system. The DSN radiates a Ka-band uplink, which is picked up by Juno's Ka-Band communication system and then processed by a special communication box called KaTS, and then this new signal is sent back the DSN. This allows the velocity of the spacecraft over time to be determined with a level of precision that allows a more accurate determination of the gravity field at planet Jupiter.

Another radio science experiment is REX on the New Horizons spacecraft to Pluto–Charon. REX received a signal from Earth as it was occulted by Pluto, to take various measurements of that system of bodies.

== See also ==
Extended NASA missions

- Mars Science Laboratory
  - Curiosity rover
  - Perseverance rover
- Voyager program (Heliosheath and Heliopause)
  - Voyager 1
  - Voyager 2
- International Cometary Explorer (Earth's magnetic field and Solar wind)
- New Horizons (Pluto)
- James Webb Space Telescope

Related sources and topics

- Space Network
- Near Earth Network
- Lunar Exploration Ground Sites
- Space Communications and Navigation Program (SCaN)
- Tracking and Data Relay Satellite
- List of observatories
- List of radio telescopes
- Interplanetary Internet
