= Earth observation satellite =

Satellite designed to observe Earth from orbit

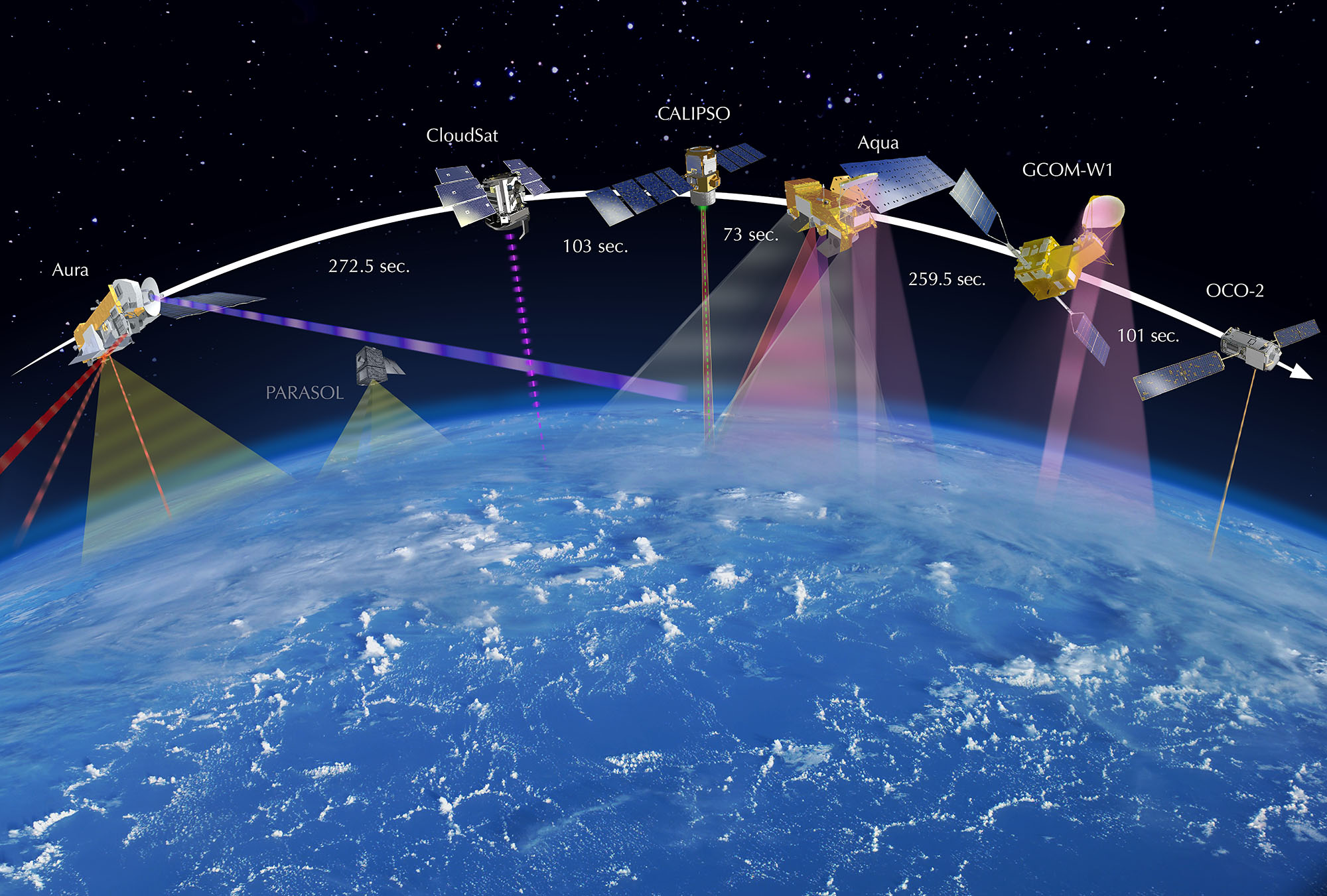
Six Earth observation satellites comprising the A-train satellite constellation as of 2014

An Earth observation satellite or Earth remote sensing satellite is a satellite used or designed for Earth observation (EO) from orbit, including spy satellites and similar ones intended for non-military uses such as environmental monitoring, meteorology, cartography and others. The most common type are Earth imaging satellites, that take satellite images, analogous to aerial photographs; some EO satellites may perform remote sensing without forming pictures, such as in GNSS radio occultation.

The first occurrence of satellite remote sensing can be dated to the launch of the first artificial satellite, Sputnik 1, by the Soviet Union on October 4, 1957. Sputnik 1 sent back radio signals, which scientists used to study the ionosphere.

The United States Army Ballistic Missile Agency launched the first American satellite, Explorer 1, for NASA's Jet Propulsion Laboratory on January 31, 1958. The information sent back from its radiation detector led to the discovery of the Earth's Van Allen radiation belts. The TIROS-1 spacecraft, launched on April 1, 1960, as part of NASA's Television Infrared Observation Satellite (TIROS) program, sent back the first television footage of weather patterns to be taken from space.

In 2008, more than 150 Earth observation satellites were in orbit, recording data with both passive and active sensors and acquiring more than 10 terabits of data daily. By 2021, that total had grown to over 950, with the largest number of satellites operated by US-based company Planet Labs.

Most Earth observation satellites carry instruments that should be operated at a relatively low altitude. Most orbit at altitudes above 500 to 600 kilometers (310 to 370 mi). Lower orbits have significant air-drag, which makes frequent orbit reboost maneuvers necessary. The Earth observation satellites ERS-1, ERS-2 and Envisat of European Space Agency as well as the MetOp spacecraft of EUMETSAT are all operated at altitudes of about 800 km (500 mi). The Proba-1, Proba-2 and SMOS spacecraft of European Space Agency are observing the Earth from an altitude of about 700 km (430 mi). The Earth observation satellites of UAE, DubaiSat-1 & DubaiSat-2 are also placed in Low Earth orbits (LEO) orbits and providing satellite imagery of various parts of the Earth.

To get global coverage with a low orbit, a polar orbit is used. A low orbit will have an orbital period of about 100 minutes and the Earth will rotate around its polar axis about 25° between successive orbits. The ground track moves towards the west 25° each orbit, allowing a different section of the globe to be scanned with each orbit. Most are in Sun-synchronous orbits.

A geostationary orbit, at 36,000 km (22,000 mi), allows a satellite to hover over a constant spot on the earth since the orbital period at this altitude is 24 hours. This allows uninterrupted coverage of more than 1/3 of the Earth per satellite, so three satellites, spaced 120° apart, can cover the whole Earth. This type of orbit is mainly used for meteorological satellites.

== History ==
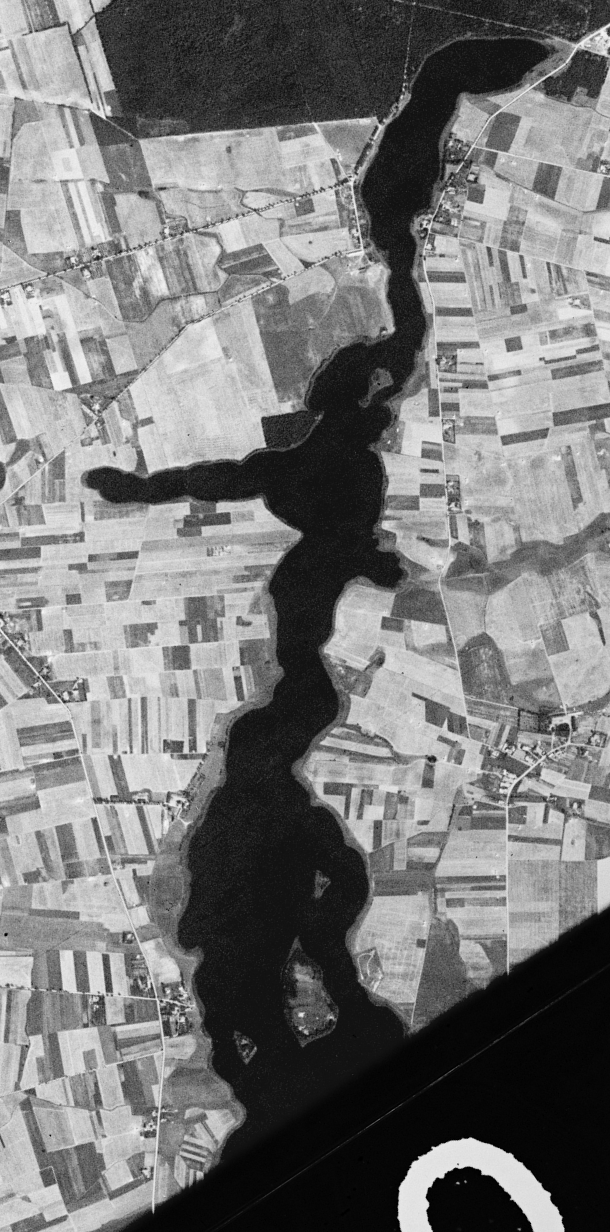
Lednickie Lake (Poland) seen by the American reconnaissance satellite CORONA 98, 1965

Herman Potočnik explored the idea of using orbiting spacecraft for detailed peaceful and military observation of the ground in his 1928 book, The Problem of Space Travel. He described how the special conditions of space could be useful for scientific experiments. The book described geostationary satellites (first put forward by Konstantin Tsiolkovsky) and discussed communication between them and the ground using radio, but fell short of the idea of using satellites for mass broadcasting and as telecommunications relays.

The onset of the Cold War prompted the rapid development of Satellite launch systems and camera technology capable of sufficient Earth observation to garner intelligence on enemy military infrastructure and evaluate nuclear posture. Following the U-2 incident in 1960, which highlighted the risks of aerial spying, the U.S. accelerated surveillance satellite programs like CORONA. Satellites largely replaced aircraft overflights for surveillance after 1960.

== Applications ==
=== Weather ===
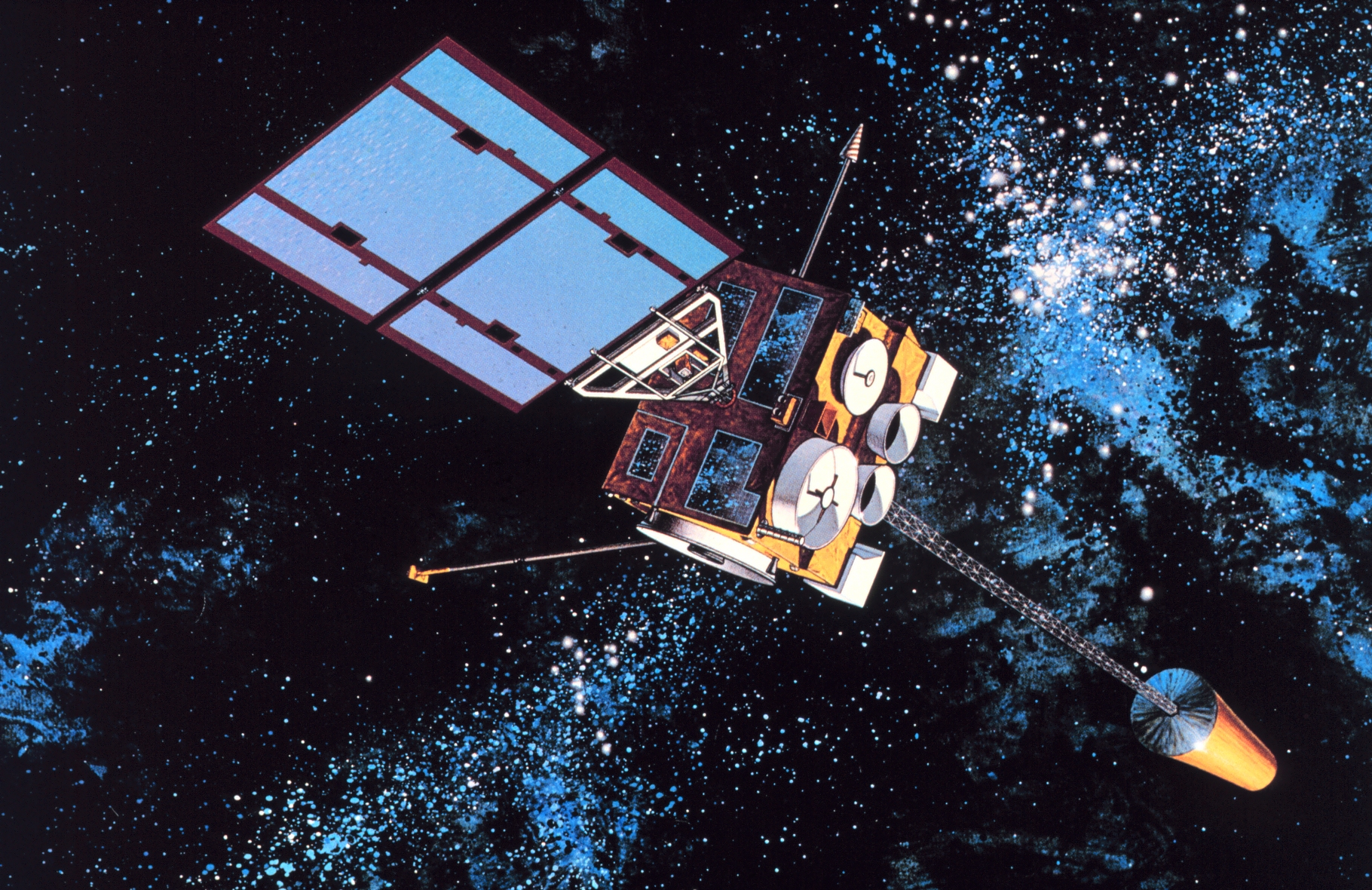
GOES-8, a United States weather satellite

A weather satellite is a type of satellite that is primarily used to monitor the weather and climate of the Earth. These meteorological satellites, however, see more than clouds and cloud systems. City lights, fires, effects of pollution, auroras, sand and dust storms, snow cover, ice mapping, boundaries of ocean currents, energy flows, etc., are other types of environmental information collected using weather satellites.

Weather satellite images helped in monitoring the volcanic ash cloud from Mount St. Helens and activity from other volcanoes such as Mount Etna. Smoke from fires in the western United States such as Colorado and Utah have also been monitored.

=== Environmental monitoring ===
Composite satellite image of the Earth, showing its entire surface in equirectangular projection

Other environmental satellites can assist environmental monitoring by detecting changes in the Earth's vegetation, atmospheric trace gas content, sea state, ocean color, and ice fields. By monitoring vegetation changes over time, droughts can be monitored by comparing the current vegetation state to its long term average. For example, the 2002 oil spill off the northwest coast of Spain was watched carefully by the European ENVISAT, which, though not a weather satellite, flies an instrument (ASAR) which can see changes in the sea surface. Anthropogenic emissions can be monitored by evaluating data of tropospheric NO_{2} and SO_{2}.

These types of satellites are almost always in Sun-synchronous and "frozen" orbits. A Sun-synchronous orbit passes over each spot on the ground at the same time of day, so that observations from each pass can be more easily compared, since the Sun is in the same spot in each observation. A "frozen" orbit is the closest possible orbit to a circular orbit that is undisturbed by the oblateness of the Earth, gravitational attraction from the Sun and Moon, solar radiation pressure, and air drag.

=== Mapping ===
Terrain can be mapped from space with the use of satellites, such as Radarsat-1 and TerraSAR-X.

== International regulations ==
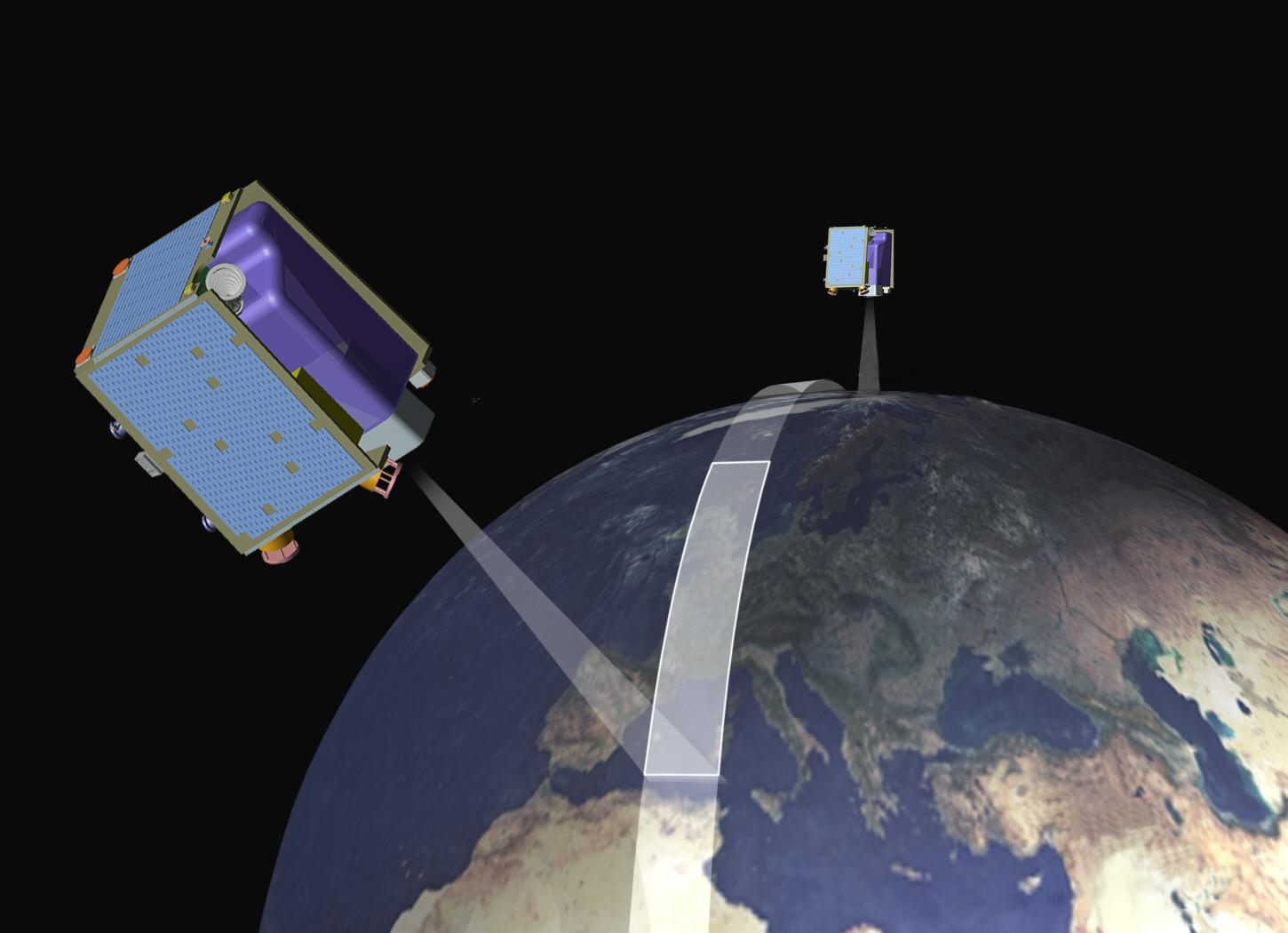
RapidEye Earth exploration-satellite system in action around the Earth

According to the International Telecommunication Union (ITU), Earth exploration-satellite service (also: Earth exploration-satellite radiocommunication service) is – according to Article 1.51 of the ITU Radio Regulations (RR) – defined as:

A radiocommunication service between earth stations and one or more space stations, which may include links between space stations, in which:

- information relating to the characteristics of the Earth and its natural phenomena, including data relating to the state of the environment, is obtained from passive or active sensors on satellites;
- similar information is collected from airborne or Earth-based platforms;
- such information may be distributed to earth stations within the system concerned;
- platform interrogation may be included.

This service may also include feeder links necessary for its operation.

=== Classification ===
This radiocommunication service is classified in accordance with ITU Radio Regulations (article 1) as follows:
Fixed service (article 1.20)

- Fixed-satellite service (article 1.21)
- Inter-satellite service (article 1.22)
- Earth exploration-satellite service
  - Meteorological-satellite service (article 1.52)

=== Frequency allocation ===
The allocation of radio frequencies is provided according to Article 5 of the ITU Radio Regulations (edition 2012).

In order to improve harmonisation in spectrum utilisation, the majority of service-allocations stipulated in this document were incorporated in national Tables of Frequency Allocations and Utilisations which is with-in the responsibility of the appropriate national administration. The allocation might be primary, secondary, exclusive, and shared.

- primary allocation: is indicated by writing in capital letters (see example below)
- secondary allocation: is indicated by small letters
- exclusive or shared utilization: is within the responsibility of administrations

However, military usage, in bands where there is civil usage, will be in accordance with the ITU Radio Regulations.

Example of frequency allocation

Allocation to services
Region 1	Region 2	Region 3
401-402 MHz METEOROLOGICAL AIDS SPACE OPERATION (space-to-Earth); EARTH EXPLORATION-SATELLITE (Earth-to-space); METEOROLOGICAL-SATELLITE (Earth-to-space); Fixed; Mobile except aeronautical mobile
13.4-13.75 GHz EARTH EXPLORATION-SATELLITE (active) RADIOLOCATION; SPACE RESEARCH; Standard frequency and time signal-satellite (Earth-to-space)

== See also ==
- Committee on Earth Observation Satellites
- Data collection satellite
- Earth observation
- Earth observation satellites transmission frequencies
- Earth Observing System - a NASA program comprising a series of satellite missions
- First images of Earth from space
- Imaging satellites
- List of Earth observation satellites
- Space telescope
- Satellite imagery
- GNSS radio occultation
- Microwave radiometer#Spaceborne
- Radar earth observation satellite
  - Radar imaging
  - Synthetic-aperture radar
    - Interferometric synthetic-aperture radar
- Satellite altimetry
