= Advanced multi-mission operations system =

Group of tools for operating spacecraft

The advanced multi-mission operations system (AMMOS) is a common set of services and tools created by the Interplanetary Network Directorate, a division of the Jet Propulsion Laboratory, for use in JPL's operation of spacecraft. These tools include a means by which mission planning and analysis can be undertaken, as well as developing pre-planned command sequences for the spacecraft. AMMOS also provides a means by which downlinked data can be displayed and manipulated, including key mission telemetry such as readings of temperature, pressure, power, and other critical indicators. This common toolset allows space missions to minimize the cost of developing operations infrastructure, which is very important in light of recent restricted spending by space agencies.
