= Forest Industries Telecommunications =

- Founded: 1947
- Type: Non-profit association
- Purpose: Frequency coordinator
- Location: 1599 Oak Street, Eugene, Oregon
- Region served: United States
- Method: FCC certification
- Website: www.landmobile.com

Forest Industries Telecommunications (FIT) is a Federal Communications Commission (FCC) certified frequency coordinator and a non-profit association. Established in 1947, its members include those companies or individuals who employ or are eligible to use Land Mobile Radio Service (LMRS) two-way radios.

They help manage radio frequency spectrum, perform engineering services, and prepare and certify applications for submission to the FCC. In 1997, FIT was certified to coordinate and file applications on behalf of all business and special emergency entities.

== History ==
FIT was organized early in 1947 to represent the needs of the forest products industry to the Federal Communications Commission. The forest industry operates in remote regions where commercial wireless systems are not available; according to the FCC, this lack of coverage is one of the most commonly cited reasons for having a Private Land Mobile Radio (PLMR) system. Among the forestry industries, private radio service is chiefly used by the lumber and paper industries.

In 1982, the United States Congress amended the Communications Act of 1934, permitting the FCC to certify private companies as frequency coordinators in order to develop and manage the Land Mobile Radio Service spectrum. FIT was among the pioneers using computer databases to manage LMRS frequencies.

Until February 1997, private land mobile radio frequencies below 512 MHz were divided among ten separate radio services: the Industrial Radio Services (Power, Petroleum, Forest Products, Film & Video Production, Relay Press, Special Industrial, Business, Manufacturers, Telephone Maintenance) and the Land Transportation Radio Services (Motor Carrier, Railroad, Taxicab, Automobile Emergency). As part of a "refarming" initiative to use these frequencies more efficiently, the FCC consolidated these services into one Industrial/Business Radio Pool. As a former coordinator for the Forest Products pool, FIT could then coordinate frequencies throughout the Industrial/Business Radio Pool, along with the other former coordinators.

In November 2001, Nextel Communications proposed that the FCC relocate certain users of the 800 MHz radio band to address interference problems between commercial users and public-safety radio services. Along with the National Association of Manufacturers, MRFAC (another frequency coordinator), the American Petroleum Institute, and others, FIT protested Nextel's proposal. FIT endorsed a "consensus plan" alternative.

In 2004, the FCC extended FIT's frequency-coordination authority to the 929–930 MHz paging frequencies and the PLMR Special Emergency frequencies below 512 MHz.

FIT was the only group to protest a proposal removing the FCC's rule against high-powered mobile repeaters in the Industrial/Business Pool frequencies below 450 MHz in 2010, citing concerns that without the rule, licensees might engage in a "power war", creating interference. The FCC understood, but did not share, FIT's concern.
