= Land mobile service =

Radiocommunication service

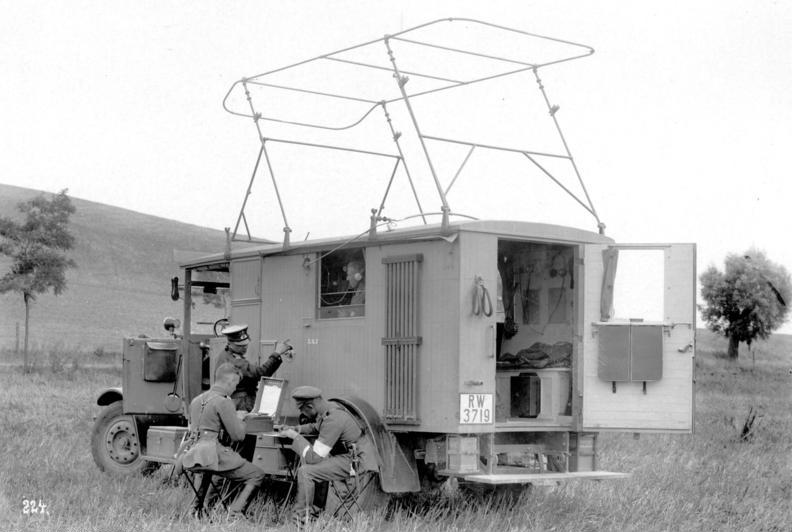
Land mobile station with NVIS roof aerial of the Reichswehr, 1928.

Land mobile service (short: LMS) is – in line to ITU Radio Regulations – a mobile service between base stations and land mobile stations, or between land mobile stations.

In accordance with ITU Radio Regulations (article 1) variations of this radiocommunication service are classified as follows:
Mobile service (article 1.24)

- Land mobile service (article 1.26)
  - Land mobile-satellite service (article 1.27)

== Frequency allocation ==
The allocation of radio frequencies is provided according to Article 5 of the ITU Radio Regulations (edition 2012).

In order to improve harmonisation in spectrum utilisation, the majority of service-allocations stipulated in this document were incorporated in national Tables of Frequency Allocations and Utilisations which is within the responsibility of the appropriate national administration. The allocation might be primary, secondary, exclusive, and shared.

- primary allocation: is indicated by writing in capital letters
- secondary allocation: is indicated by small letters (see example below)
- exclusive or shared utilization: is within the responsibility of administrations

However, military usage, in bands where there is civil usage, will be in accordance with the ITU Radio Regulations. In NATO countries, military land mobile utilizations will be in accordance with the NATO Joint Civil/Military Frequency Agreement (NJFA).

== FCC LMR Narrowbanding Mandate ==
LMR Narrowbanding is the result of an FCC Order issued in December 2004 mandating that all CFR 47 Part 90 business, educational, industrial, public safety, and state and local government VHF (150-174 MHz) and UHF (421-470 MHz) Private Land Mobile Radio (PLMR) licensees operating legacy wideband (25 kHz bandwidth) voice or data/SCADA systems to migrate to narrowband (12.5 kHz bandwidth or equivalent) systems by January 1, 2013.

== See also ==
- Business Radio Service
- Land mobile radio system
- Narrowband
- Forest Industries Telecommunications
- Radio station
- Radiocommunication service
