= Deep space bands =

Frequency bands used for deep and near space research

Deep space bands and near space bands are frequency bands that have been allocated to space research services by the International Telecommunication Union for use in deep space and near space research.

Frequency allocations in MHz
Band designation	Deep space bands (for space stations more than 2,000,000 km from Earth)		Near space bands (for space stations less than 2,000,000 km from Earth)	
Band designation	Up-link (Earth to space)	Down-link (Space to Earth)	Up-link (Earth to space)	Down-link (Space to Earth)
S band	2110–2120	2290–2300	2025–2110	2200–2290
X band	7 145–7 190	8 400–8 450	7 190–7 235	8 450–8 500
K band	*	*	*	25 500–27 000
K_{a} band	34 200–34 700	31 800–32 300	*	*

* = No assignment or not supported by the DSN
