= MIMO radar =

Radar with multiple antennas for transmitting and receiving

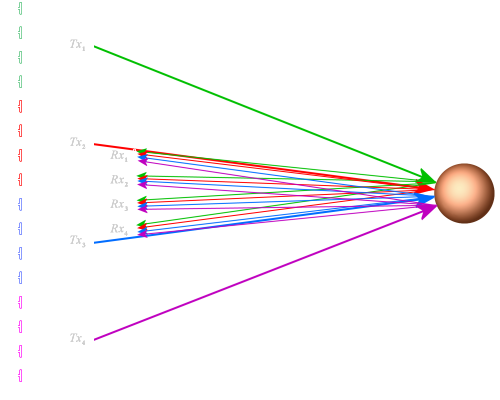
In a MIMO system, the transmitting signals from the single transmitters are different. As a result, the echo signals can be re-assigned to the source. This gives an enlarged virtual receive aperture.

Multiple-input multiple-output (MIMO) radar is an extension of a traditional radar system to utilize multiple-inputs and multiple-outputs (antennas), similar to MIMO techniques used to increase the capacity of a radio link. MIMO radar is an advanced type of phased array radar employing digital receivers and waveform generators distributed across the aperture. MIMO radar signals propagate in a fashion similar to multistatic radar. However, instead of distributing the radar elements throughout the surveillance area, antennas are closely located to obtain better spatial resolution, Doppler resolution, and dynamic range. MIMO radar may also be used to obtain low-probability-of-intercept radar properties.

In a traditional phased array system, additional antennas and related hardware are needed to improve spatial resolution. MIMO radar systems transmit mutually orthogonal signals from multiple transmit antennas, and these waveforms can be extracted from each of the receive antennas by a set of matched filters. For example, if a MIMO radar system has 3 transmit antennas and 4 receive antennas, 12 signals can be extracted from the receiver because of the orthogonality of the transmitted signals. That is, a 12-element virtual antenna array is created using only 7 antennas by conducting digital signal processing on the received signals, thereby obtaining a finer spatial resolution compared with its phased array counterpart.

== The concept of virtual array ==
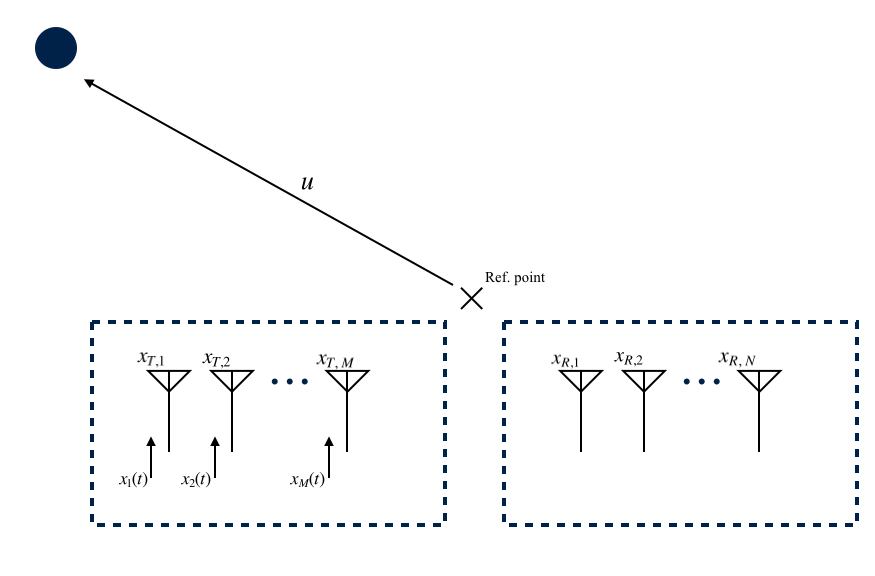
Scenario of virtual array analysis

The picture shows a M-by-N MIMO radar system. Suppose that a target is located at u, the $\scriptstyle m^{th}$ transmit antenna is located at $\scriptstyle x_{T, m}$ and the $\scriptstyle n^{th}$ receive antenna is located at $\scriptstyle x_{R, n}$. The received signal at $\scriptstyle n^{th}$ receive antenna can be expressed as:

$$y_{n}(t)=\sum_{m=1}^{M}x_{m}(t)e^{j\frac{2\pi}{\lambda}u^T(x_{T, m}+x_{R, n})}$$

As mentioned earlier, if {$\scriptstyle x_{m}(t)$, m=1, ..., M} is an orthogonal set, we can extract M signals from $\scriptstyle n^{th}$ receive antenna, each of which contains the information of an individual transmitting path($\scriptstyle u^T(x_{T, m}+x_{R, n})$).

In order to make a comparison between phased array radars and MIMO radars, the relationship between transmit/receive antenna arrays and virtual arrays are discussed in several sources. If the placements of the transmit and receive antenna array are expressed as two vectors $\scriptstyle h_{T}$ and $\scriptstyle h_{R}$ respectively, the placement vector of the virtual array is equal to the convolution of $\scriptstyle h_{T}$ and $\scriptstyle h_{R}$:

$$h_{V}=h_{T}*h_{R}$$

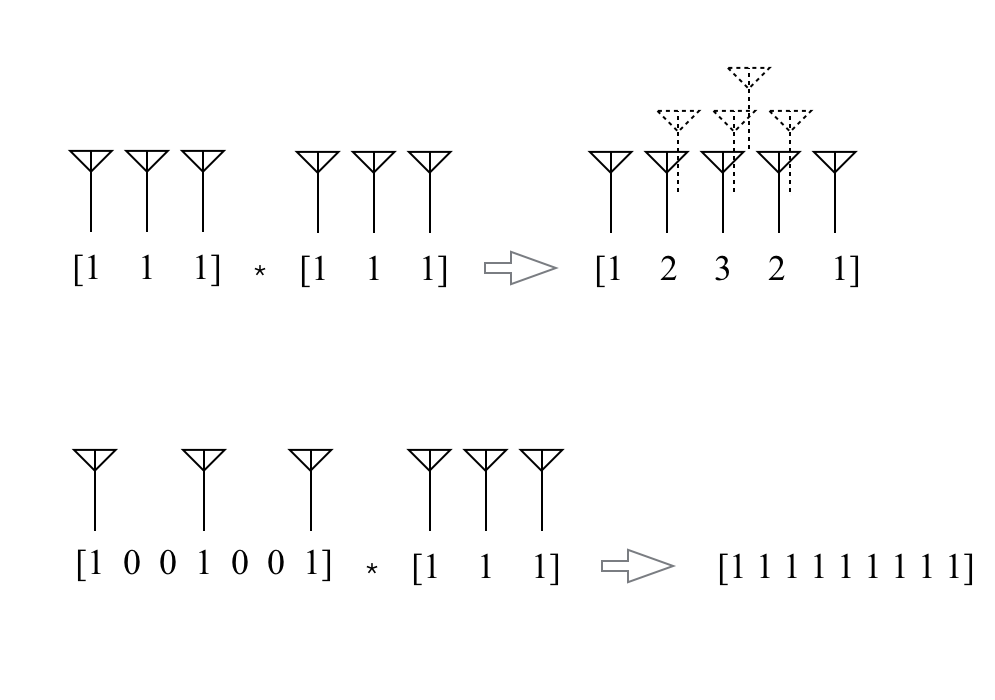
Examples of antenna geometry to form virtual array

Picture above shows the examples of antenna geometry to form a virtual array. In the first example, two uniformly distributed antenna arrays form a 5-element virtual array despite having 6 antennas in total. In the second example, a nine-element virtual array is obtained by increasing the distance between the transmit antennas, implying that a better spatial resolution can be achieved.

To estimate the direction of arrival of the targets according to the N*M signals, methods like MUSIC (algorithm) and maximum likelihood estimation are commonly used with good results.

== Orthogonal signals ==
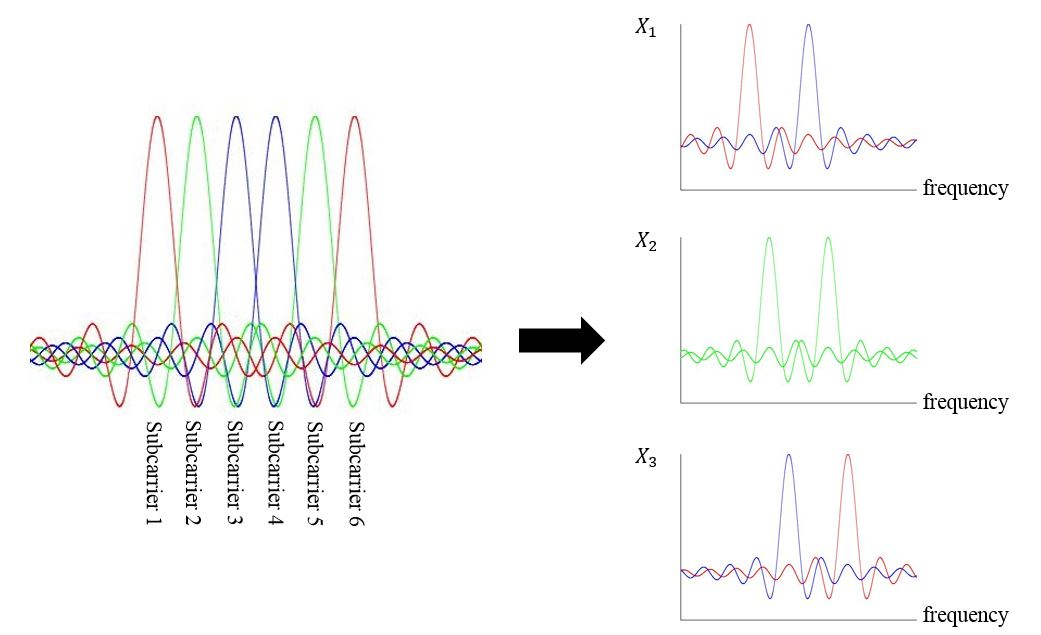
Regular subcarrier assignment to generate orthogonal signals

There are a variety of orthogonal signal sets used in the field of MIMO radar. One of the proposed signal sets is the spectrally interleaved multi-carrier signal, which is a modified version of orthogonal frequency-division multiplexing signal. In this approach, the total amount of available subcarriers is distributed among different transmit antennas in an interleaved way.

Another proposed signal set is orthogonal chirp signal, which can be expressed as:

$$x_{m}(t)=\exp \left(2\pi j(f_{m,0}t+\frac{1}{2}kt^2) \right)$$

By choosing different initial frequencies $\scriptstyle f_{m,0}$, these chirp waveforms can be made orthogonal.
