= Electromagnetic radio frequency convergence =

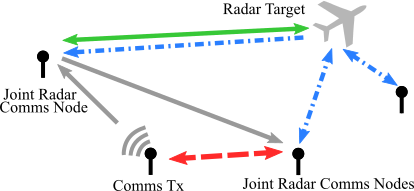
An example of what a typical communications and remote sensing network would like. As more systems get added to a network, determining the optimal method of operation between all the systems (achieving RF convergence) becomes increasingly difficult. Instead of considering each other as a source of interference, the next generation of systems must be co-designed from scratch such that each system's functionality takes into account the presence of other systems.

Electromagnetic radio frequency (RF) convergence is a signal-processing paradigm that is utilized when several RF systems have to share a finite amount of resources among each other. RF convergence indicates the ideal operating point for the entire network of RF systems sharing resources such that the systems can efficiently share resources in a manner that's mutually beneficial. With communications spectral congestion recently becoming an increasingly important issue for the telecommunications sector, researchers have begun studying methods of achieving RF convergence for cooperative spectrum sharing between remote sensing systems (such as radar) and communications systems. Consequentially, RF convergence is commonly referred to as the operating point of a remote sensing and communications network at which spectral resources are jointly shared by all nodes (or systems) of the network in a mutually beneficial manner. Remote sensing and communications have conflicting requirements and functionality. Furthermore, spectrum sharing approaches between remote sensing and communications have traditionally been to separate or isolate both systems (temporally, spectrally or spatially). This results in stove pipe designs that lack back compatibility. Future of hybrid RF systems demand co-existence and cooperation between sensibilities with flexible system design and implementation. Hence, achieving RF convergence can be an incredibly complex and difficult problem to solve. Even for a simple network consisting of one remote sensing and communications system each, there are several independent factors in the time, space, and frequency domains that have to be taken into consideration in order to determine the optimal method to share spectral resources. For a given spectrum-space-time resource manifold, a practical network will incorporate numerous remote sensing modalities and communications systems, making the problem of achieving RF convergence intangible.

== Motivation ==
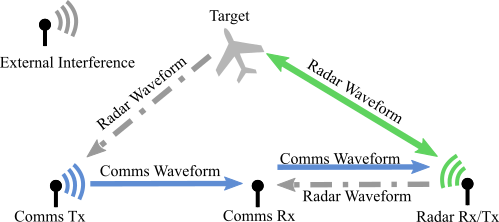
Notional example of a simple network topology that highlights the current RF spectrum challenges. The network consists of two users, a communications user and a radar user, and a source of external interference. Users can operate either by occupying the same spectrum or by being physically co-located (occupying the same space). Regardless of the mode of operation, both systems will interfere with each other and interference mitigation is needed to maintain optimal performance.

Spectral congestion is caused by too many RF communications users concurrently accessing the electromagnetic spectrum. This congestion may degrade communications performance and decrease or even restrict access to spectral resources. Spectrum sharing between radar and communications applications was proposed as a way to alleviate the issues caused by spectral congestion. This has led to a greater emphasis being placed by researchers into investigating methods of radar-communications cooperation and co-design. Government agencies such as The Defense Advanced Research Projects Agency (DARPA) and others have begun funding research that investigates methods of coexistence for military radar systems, such that their performance will not be affected when sharing spectrum with communications systems. These agencies are also interested in fundamental research investigating the limits of cooperation between military radar and communications systems that in the long run will lead to better co-design methods that improve performance. However, the problems caused by spectrum sharing do not affect just military systems. There are a wide variety of remote sensing and communications applications that will be adversely affected by sharing spectrum with communications systems such as automotive radars, medical devices, 5G etc. Furthermore, applications like autonomous automobiles and smart home networks can stand to benefit substantially by cooperative remote sensing and communications. Consequently, researchers have started investigating fundamental approaches to joint remote sensing and communications.

Remote sensing and communications fundamentally tend to conflict with one another. Remote sensing typically transmits known information into the environment (or channel) and measures a reflected response, which is then used to extract unknown information about the environment. For example, in the case of a radar system, the known information is the transmitted signal and the unknown information is the target channel that is desired to be estimated. On the other hand, a communications system basically sends unknown information into a known environment. Although a communications system does not know what the environment (also called a propagation channel) is beforehand, every system operates under the assumption that it is either previously estimated or its underlying probability distribution is known. Due to both systems' conflicting nature, it is clear that when it comes to designing systems that can jointly sense and communicate, the solution is non-trivial. Due to difficulties in jointly sensing and communicating, both systems are often designed to be isolated in time, space, and/or frequency. Often, the only time legacy systems consider the other user in their mode of operation is through regulations, which are defined by agencies such as the FCC (United States), that constrain the other user's functionality. As spectral congestion continues to force both remote sensing and communications system to share spectral resources, achieving RF convergence is the solution to optimally function in an increasingly crowded wireless spectrum.

== Applications of joint sensing-communications systems ==
Several applications can benefit from RF convergence research such as autonomous driving, cloud-based medical devices, light based applications etc. Each application may have different goals, requirements, and regulations which present different challenges to achieving RF convergence. A few examples of joint sensing-communications applications are listed below.

- Intelligent Transport Systems (Vehicle-to-vehicle Communications)
- Commercial Flight Control
- Communications & Military Radar
- Remote Medical Monitoring and Wearable Medical Sensors
- High Frequency Imaging and Communications
- Li-Fi and Lidar
- RFID & Asset Tracking
- Capable Wireless Sensor Networks

== Joint sensing-communications system design and integration ==
Joint sensing-communications systems can be designed based on four different types of system integration. These different levels range from complete isolation, to complete co-design of systems. Some levels of integration, such as non-integration (or isolation) and coexistence, are not complex in nature and do not require an overhaul of how either sensing or communications systems operate. However, this lack of complexity also implies that joint systems employing such methods of system integration will not see significant performance benefits on achieving RF convergence. As such, non-integration and coexistence methods are more short-term solutions to the spectral congestion problem. In the long term, systems will have to be co-designed together to see significant improvements in joint system performance.

=== Non-integration ===
Systems employing non-integration methods are forced to operate in isolated regions of spectrum-space-time. However, in the real world, perfect isolation is not realizable and as a result, isolated systems will leak out and occupy segments of spectrum-space-time occupied by other systems. This is why systems that employ non-integration methods end up interfering with each other, and due to the philosophy of isolation being employed, each system makes no attempt at interference mitigation. Consequentially, each user's performance is degraded. Non-integration is one of the common and traditional solutions, and as highlighted here, is a part of the problem.

=== Coexistence ===
Remote sensing and communications systems that implement coexistence methods are forced to coexist with each other and treat each other as sources of interference. This means that unlike non-integration methods, each system tries to perform interference mitigation. However, since both systems are not cooperative and have no knowledge about the other system, any information required to perform such interference mitigation is not shared or known and has to be estimated. As a result, interference mitigation performance is limited since it is dependent on the estimated information.

=== Cooperation ===
Cooperative techniques, unlike coexistence methods, do not require that both sensing and communications systems treat each other as sources of interference and both systems share some knowledge or information. Cooperative methods exploit this joint knowledge to enable both systems to effectively perform interference mitigation and subsequently improve their performance. Systems willingly share necessary information with each other in order to facilitate mutual interference mitigation. Cooperative methods are the first step toward designing joint systems and achieving RF convergence as an effective solution to the spectral congestion problem..

=== Co-design ===
Co-design methods consist of jointly considering radar and communications systems when designing new systems to optimally share spectral resources. Such systems are jointly designed from scratch to efficiently utilize the spectrum and can potentially result in performance benefits when compared to an isolated approach to system design. Co-designed systems are not necessarily physically co-located. When operating from the same platform, co-design includes the cases where radar beams and waveforms are modulated to convey communications messages, an approach which is typically referred to as dual function radar communications systems. For example, some recent experimentally demonstrated co-design approaches include:

- Tandem hopped radar and communications (THoRaCs), where undistorted orthogonal frequency-division multiplexing (OFDM) sub-carriers are embedded into a frequency modulation (FM) radar waveform
- Phase-attached radar/communication (PARC), where FM and continuous phase modulation (CPM) are merged into a single waveform
- Far-field radiated emission design (FFRED), where FM multiple-input and multiple-output (MIMO) waveforms produce separate radar and communication beams in different spatial directions

== See also ==
- Radar
- Communications Systems
- Co-channel interference
- Spectrum Management
- Radio resource management
