= Frequency assignment =

Radio frequency authorization

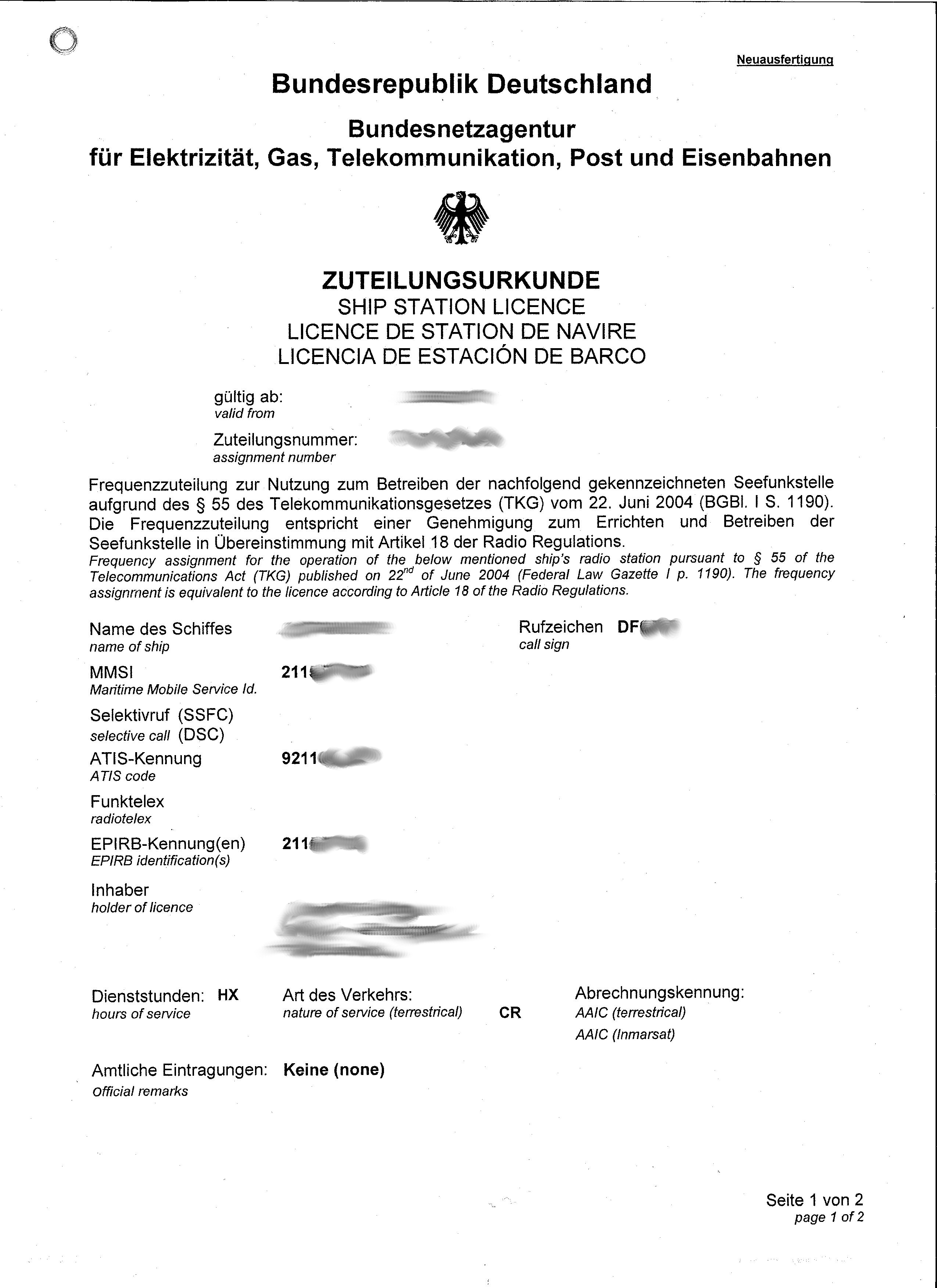
German frequency assignment document (German: Zuteilungsurkunde)

Frequency assignment is the authorization of use of a particular radio frequency.

In Article 1.18 of the International Telecommunication Union's (ITU) Radio Regulations (RR), the process is defined as "Authorization given by a frequency administration for a radio station to use a radio frequency or radio frequency channel under specified conditions".

Frequency assignment is also a special term, used by national frequency administrations. For other terms see table below.

ITU-terms pertaining to frequency regulation
Frequency distribution to:	ITU languages						ITU RR (article)
Frequency distribution to:	French	English	Spanish	Arabic	Chinese	Russian	ITU RR (article)
Radiocommunication services	attribution (attribuer)	allocation (to allocate)	attribucion (attribuir)			распределение (распределять)	1.16
Regions or countries	allotisement (allotir)	allotment (to allot)	adjudication (adjudicar)			выделение (выделять)	1.17
Radio stations	assignation (assigner)	assignment (to assign)	asignacion (assignar)			присвоение (присваивать)	1.18

== See also ==
- Radio station
- Spectrum management
- Frequency coordinator
- Broadcast license
- Cellular frequencies
- Earth observation satellites transmission frequencies

== References / sources ==
- International Telecommunication Union (ITU)
