= Frequency coordinator =

Organizations coordinating spectrum usage in the U.S.

In 1982, the United States Congress provided the Federal Communications Commission (FCC) the statutory authority to use frequency coordinators to assist in developing and managing the Private Land Mobile Radio (PLMR) spectrum. Frequency coordinators, in this case, are private organizations that have been certified by the Commission to recommend the most appropriate frequencies for applicants in the designated Part 90 radio services. This frequency coordination process is intended to make more efficient use of the PLMR spectrum for the benefit of all members of the public. In general, applications for new frequency assignments, changes to existing facilities or operation at temporary locations must include a showing of frequency coordination.

Anything that requires Frequency Coordination must be electronically submitted by the Coordinator. Frequency Coordination is required for a new filing. Major Modifications and Amendments that change or add frequencies, emissions, ERP, Output Power, Antenna Height, Ground Elevation, change location of Base, Fixed, Mobile or Control stations or number of Mobile units and any change to station class. (Hydro frequencies listed in CFR 47 Section 90.265(a). Go through the National Oceanic and Atmospheric Administration (NOAA) for coordination.

Frequency Coordination is not required for STAs unless the applicant is requesting a waiver of the 180-day limit of STA. Developmental and Demonstration applications, Radiolocation (RS) applications, Itinerant operations and station classes ending in the letter "I" or "L" and applications for 6.1 Meter Control Stations.

There are different frequency coordinators authorized for the different categories of PLMR spectrum.

- For frequencies in the 470-512 MHz band, applicants may use any frequency coordinator.
- For frequencies below 470 MHz and above 512 MHz, applicants must choose a frequency coordinator as specified below.

== List of coordinators ==
Public Safety
IMSA
Business and special emergency
Forest Industries Telecommunications
