= Spectrum management =

Regulating the use of radio frequencies to promote efficient use

Spectrum management is the process of regulating the use of radio frequencies to promote efficient use and gain a net social benefit. The term radio spectrum typically refers to the full frequency range from 1 Hz to 3000 GHz (3 THz) that may be used for wireless communication. Increasing demand for services such as mobile telephones and many others has required changes in the philosophy of spectrum management. Demand for wireless broadband has soared due to technological innovation, such as 3G and 4G mobile services, and the rapid expansion of wireless internet services.

Since the 1930s, spectrum was assigned through administrative licensing. Limited by technology, signal interference was once considered as a major problem of spectrum use. Therefore, exclusive licensing was established to protect licensees' signals. This former practice of discrete bands licensed to groups of similar services is giving way, in many countries, to a "spectrum auction" model that is intended to speed technological innovation and improve the efficiency of spectrum use. During the experimental process of spectrum assignment, other approaches have also been carried out, namely, lotteries, unlicensed access, and privatization of spectrum.

Most recently, America has been moving toward a shared spectrum policy, whereas Europe has been pursuing an authorized shared access (ASA) licensing model. President Obama made shared spectrum the policy of the United States on 14 June 2013, following recommendations from the President's Council of Advisors for Science and Technology (PCAST) which advocated the sharing of (uncleared) federal radio spectrum when unused at a place and time provided it does not pose undue risks. In line with this guidance, as of Dec 2014 the FCC was extending the limited success of television band spectrum sharing (TV white space) into other bands, significantly into the 3550–3700 MHz US Navy radar band via a three tier licensing model (incumbent, priority, and general access).

== Governments and spectrum management ==
Most countries consider RF spectrum as an exclusive property of the state. The RF spectrum is a national resource, much like water, land, gas and minerals. Unlike these, however, RF is reusable. The purpose of spectrum management is to mitigate radio spectrum pollution, and maximize the benefit of usable radio spectrum.

The first sentence of the International Telecommunication Union (ITU) constitution fully recognises "the sovereign right of each State to regulate its telecommunication". Effective spectrum management requires regulation at national, regional, and global levels.

Goals of spectrum management include: rationalize and optimize the use of the RF spectrum; avoid and solve interference; design short and long range frequency allocations; advance the introduction of new wireless technologies; coordinate wireless communications with neighbours and other administrations. Radio spectrum items which need to be nationally regulated: frequency allocation for various radio services, assignment of license and RF to transmitting stations, type approval of equipment (for countries out of the European Union), fee collection, notifying ITU for the Master International Frequency Register (MIFR), coordination with neighbour countries (as there are no borders to the radio waves), external relations toward regional commissions (such as CEPT in Europe, CITEL in America) and toward ITU.

== Spectrum use ==
Spectrum management is a growing problem due to the growing number of spectrum uses. Uses include: over-the-air broadcasting, (which started in 1920); government and research uses (which include defense, public safety—maritime, air, police—resource management, transport, and radio astronomy); commercial services to the public (including voice, data, home networking); and industrial, scientific and medical services (which include Telemedicine, and remote control).

In the 1980s, the only concern was about radio and television broadcasting; but today mobile phones and wireless computer networks are more and more important as fewer than 15% of US households rely on over-the-air broadcasting to receive their TV signals.

The US spectrum is managed either by the Federal Communications Commission (FCC) for non-governmental applications or by the National Telecommunications and Information Administration (NTIA) for governmental applications. For shared application, both entities should agree.

The spectrum is divided into different frequency bands, each having a specific application. For instance, the frequency band that covers 300 kHz to 535 kHz is reserved for aeronautical and maritime communications and the spectrum from 520 kHz to 1700 kHz for AM radio. This process is called "allocation".

The next step is to assign frequencies to specific users or classes of users. Each frequency band has a specific assignment that depends on the nature of the application and the numbers of users. Indeed, some applications require a wider band than others (AM radio uses blocks of 10 kHz where FM radio uses blocks of 200 kHz). In addition, "guard bands" are needed to keep the interference between applications to a minimum.

== Status quo: the command and control approach ==
The Command and Control management approach is the one currently employed by most regulators around the globe. This approach advocates that the regulators be the centralized authorities for spectrum allocation and usage decisions. In the US example, the regulator (FCC) determines the use cases for specified spectrum portions, as well as the parties who will have access to them. The Federal Communications Commission (FCC) also regulates the physical layer technologies to be employed.

The allocation decisions are often static in temporal and spatial dimensions, meaning that they are valid for extended periods of time (usually decades) and for large geographical regions (country wide). The usage is often set to be exclusive; each band is dedicated to a single provider, thus maintaining interference free communication. The command and control management model dates back to initial days of wireless communications, when the technologies employed required interference-free mediums for achieving acceptable quality. Thus, it is often argued that the exclusive nature of the command and control approach is an artifact of outdated technologies.

The apparent advantages of this model is that services related to public interest could be sustained. In terms of profitability, public interest programs, for example, over-the-air television, may not be as attractive as commercial ones in the provider perspective, but they are nevertheless beneficial for the society. Therefore, these services are often implicitly enforced by the regulator through the license agreements. Another advantage is the standardization that results from such a centralized approach. Such standardization is critical in networked industries, for which the telecommunication industry is a text-book example. One scholar has published a paper that shows how the development of new technologies promises to bring considerably more spectrum to the public, but would require that society embrace a new paradigm of spectrum use.

=== GAO Report on Spectrum Management (2004) ===
Excerpt:

The current structure and management of spectrum use in the United States does not encourage the development and use of some spectrum efficient technologies. Because the spectrum allocation framework largely compartmentalizes spectrum by types of services (such as aeronautical radio navigation) and users (federal, non-federal, and shared), the capability of emerging technologies designed to use spectrum in different ways is often diminished. For example, software-defined cognitive radios — radios that adapt their use of the spectrum to the real-time conditions of their operating environments — could be used to sense unused frequencies, or "white spaces," and automatically make use of those frequencies. It may also be possible to use software-defined cognitive radios to exploit "gray spaces" in the spectrum — areas where emissions exist yet could still accommodate additional users without creating a level of interference that is unacceptable to incumbent users — to increase spectrum efficiency. Currently, however, the spectrum allocation system may not provide the freedom needed for these technologies to operate across existing spectrum designations, and defining new rules requires knowledge about spectrum that spectrum leaders do not have. At the same time, there are few federal regulatory requirements and incentives to use spectrum more efficiently. While the National Telecommunications and Information Administration (NTIA) is responsible for managing the federal government's use of spectrum and ensuring spectrum efficiency, NTIA primarily relies on individual agencies to ensure that the systems they develop are as spectrum efficient as possible. Agencies' guidance and policies, however, do not require systematic consideration of spectrum efficiency in their acquisitions. The lack of economic consequence associated with the manner in which spectrum is used has also provided little incentive to agencies to pursue opportunities proactively to develop and use technologies that would improve spectrum efficiency government-wide.

== Alternative spectrum governance regimes and the spectrum debate ==
With the digital transition, spectrum management entered a new age. Full conversion to digital TV by 17 February 2009 (Digital Transition and Public Safety Act of 2005) allows broadcasters to use spectrum more efficiently and save space for the possibility of sharing spectrum.

Spectrum sharing is the subject of heated discussion. Exponential growth of commercial wireless calls for additional spectrum to accommodate more traffic. As a regulator, the FCC responded to these needs by making more spectrum available. A secondary market has been allowed to emerge and licensees are encouraged to lease use of the spectrum to third parties temporarily. Making licenses transferable is an important attempt by the FCC to create incentives for broadcasters to share unused spectrum. Another proposed solution to the spectrum scarcity problem is to enable communications systems to occupy spectrum that was previously allocated for radar use and to cooperatively share spectrum. This approach has received increased attention recently with several research programs, including DARPA projects, investigating several methods of cooperative radar-communications spectrum sharing. More alternatives are underway such as spectrum sharing in cellular networks.

Spectrum scarcity has emerged as a primary problem encountered when trying to launch new wireless services. The effects of this scarcity are most noticeable in spectrum auctions where the operators often need to invest billions of dollars to secure access to specified bands in the available spectrum. In spite of this scarcity, recent spectrum utilization measurements have shown that the available spectrum opportunities are severely underutilized, i.e. left unused. This artificial "access limitation"-based scarcity is often considered to result from the static and rigid nature of the command and control governance regime. Interested parties have started to consider possible improvements in the governance regime by relaxing the constraints on spectrum access. Two prevailing models are the "spectrum commons" and the "spectrum property rights" approaches.

=== Spectrum commons theory ===
Under US law, the spectrum is not considered to be the property of the private sector nor of the government except insofar as the term "government" is used to be synonymous with "the people".

The original use of the term "the commons" was the practice by which the public at large had limited rights to use the commons; each person then had an interest in their own usage rights, but the commons themselves were not property, nor were the rights "property" since they could not be traded. The term "tragedy of the commons" was popularized by Garrett Hardin in a 1968 article which appeared in Science. The tragedy of the commons illustrates the philosophy that destructive use of public reservations ("the commons") by private interests can result when the best strategy for individuals conflicts with the "common good". In such a scenario, it asserts that even though the contribution of each "bad actor" may be minute, when the results of these actions are combined the resource could be degraded to the point of uselessness. This concern has led to the regulation of the spectrum.

=== Spectrum property rights model ===
The spectrum property rights model advocates that the spectrum resources should be treated like land, i.e. private ownership of spectrum portions should be permitted. The allocation of these portions should be implemented by means of market forces. The spectrum owners should be able to trade these portions in secondary markets. Alternatively, the spectrum owners would be able to use their bands in any way they want through any technology they prefer (service and technology neutrality). Although the spectrum property rights model advocates exclusive allocation of transmission rights, it is not the same as a licensed regime. The main difference is the service and technology neutrality advocated in the spectrum property rights approach, as opposed to strict requirements on services and communications technologies inherent in licensed governance regimes.

The basic idea of spectrum property rights was first proposed by Leo Herzel in 1951, who was a law student at the time, preparing a critique of the US FCC policies in spectrum management. Ronald Coase, a Nobel Prize–winning economist, championed the idea of auctioning off spectrum rights as a superior alternative to the status quo in 1959. Coase argued that, though initial distributions may affect matters, property rights in a frequency will lead to the most efficient usage thereof. When he first presented his vision to the FCC, he was asked whether he was making a joke.

The supporters of the spectrum property rights model argue that such a management scheme would potentially promote innovation and more efficient use of spectrum resources, as the spectrum owners would potentially want to economize on their resources.

The spectrum property rights model is often critiqued for potentially leading to artificial scarcity and the hold-up problem. The hold-up problem refers to the difficulty in aggregation of the spectrum resources (which would be required for high bandwidth applications), as the individual spectrum owners could ask for very high compensation in return for their contribution. Since spectrum is a scarce finite good, there is a perverse incentive to not use it at all. Participants and existing spectrum owners in the spectrum market can preemptively buy spectrum, then warehouse it to prevent existing or newcomer competitors from utilizing it. The existing spectrum owner's official plans for this warehoused spectrum would be save it for an unknown future use, and therefore not utilize it at all for the foreseeable future.

In a partial or incomplete "spectrum as property" regulatory regime, incumbent and grandfathered owners who obtained spectrum under the old cause and merit policy, can obtain windfalls in selling the spectrum they obtained for no cost under the earlier regulatory regime. When a regulatory regime changes to the property model, the original merit and cause guidelines for incumbent and grandfathered users are often removed. No regulatory review mechanism exists to check if the merit guidelines are still being followed, and if not, to then revoke the spectrum license from the incumbent spectrum owner and reissue the spectrum to a new user under old merit guidelines, or sell the spectrum inline with the new "spectrum as property" policy.

== U.S. regulatory agencies ==
The Communications Act of 1934 grants authority for spectrum management to the President for all federal use (47 USC 305). The National Telecommunications and Information Administration (NTIA) manages the spectrum for the Federal Government. Its rules are found in the NTIA Manual of Regulations and Procedures for Federal Radio Frequency Management.

The Federal Communications Commission (FCC) manages and regulates all domestic non-federal spectrum use (47 USC 301).

Background:

- Radio Act of 1927
- Communications Act of 1934
- Administrative Procedures Act of 1947
- Communications Satellite Act of 1962
- National Telecommunications and Information Administration
- Negotiated Rulemaking Act of 1990
- Cable TV Consumer Protection & Competition Act of 1992
- Omnibus Budget Reconciliation Act of 1993
- Telecommunications Act of 1996

== International spectrum management ==
The International Telecommunication Union (ITU) is the part of the United Nations (UN) that manages the use of both the RF Spectrum and space satellites among nation states. The Plenipotentiary Conference is the top policy-making body of the ITU, meeting every four years in order to set the Union's general policies. The ITU is divided into three Sectors: the Radiocommunication Sector (ITU-R) determines the technical characteristics and operational procedures for wireless services, and plays a vital role in the Spectrum Management of the radio-frequency; ITU-R Study Group 1 is the Spectrum Management study group; the Telecommunication Standardization Sector (ITU-T) develops internationally agreed technical and operating standards; and the Telecommunication Development Sector (ITU-D) fosters the expansion of telecommunications infrastructure in developing nations throughout the world, that make up two-thirds of the ITU's 191 Member States. The ITU Radio Regulations set a binding international treaty governing the use of the radio spectrum by some 40 different services.

== Frequency administration ==
In telecommunication, frequency assignment authority is the power granted for the administration, designation or delegation to an agency or administrator via treaty or law, to specify frequencies, frequency channels or frequency bands, in the electromagnetic spectrum for use in radiocommunication services, radio stations or ISM applications.

Frequency administration is – according to Article 1.2 of the International Telecommunication Union's (ITU) Radio Regulations (RR) – defined as «Any governmental department or service responsible for discharging the obligations undertaken in the Constitution of the International Telecommunication Union, in the Convention of the International Telecommunication Union and in the Administrative Regulations (CS 1002).» Definitions identical to those contained in the Annex to the Constitution or the Annex to the Convention of the International Telecommunication Union (Geneva, 1992) are marked "(CS)" or "(CV)" respectively.

International frequency assignment authority is vested in the Radiocommunication Bureau of the International Telecommunication Union (ITU).

=== Europe ===
- In Europe each country has regulatory input into the progress of European and international policy, standards, and legislation governing these sectors through their respective frequency administration.
- European frequency administrations might receive military advice by the appropriate National Radio Frequency Agency (NRFA). Pertaining to NATO-Europe, this expertise is within the Spectrum Consultation Command and Control & Infrastructure Branch (SC3IB). However, the decision making body, pertaining to military access to the radio frequency spectrum, is the NATO Civ/Mil Spectrum Capability Panel 3 (CaP3), on behalf of the NATO Consultation, Command and Control Board (C3B), with participation of competent, authorised and mandated representatives of national frequency administrations.
- Civil frequency management for Europe is driven by a number of organisations. These include the:
  - European Union (EU)
  - Independent Regulator's Group (IRG)
  - European Conference of Postal and Telecommunications Administrations (CEPT)
  - European Radiocommunications Office (ERO)

In July 2002, the European Commission also established the European Regulators Group for Electronic Communications Networks and Services; creating, for the first time, a formal structure for interaction and coordination between the European Commission and regulators in all EU Member States to ensure consistent application of European legislation.

=== United States ===
In the United States, primary frequency assignment authority is exercised by the National Telecommunications and Information Administration (NTIA) for the Federal Government and by the Federal Communications Commission (FCC) for non-Federal Government organizations.

== See also ==
- Frequency assignment
- Military spectrum management
- Broadcast license
- LTE in unlicensed spectrum
- Challenges and Strategies for Effective Spectrum Management
