= Space research service =

Extravehicular activity radiocommunication traffic during the ISS-Expedition 36 (2013)

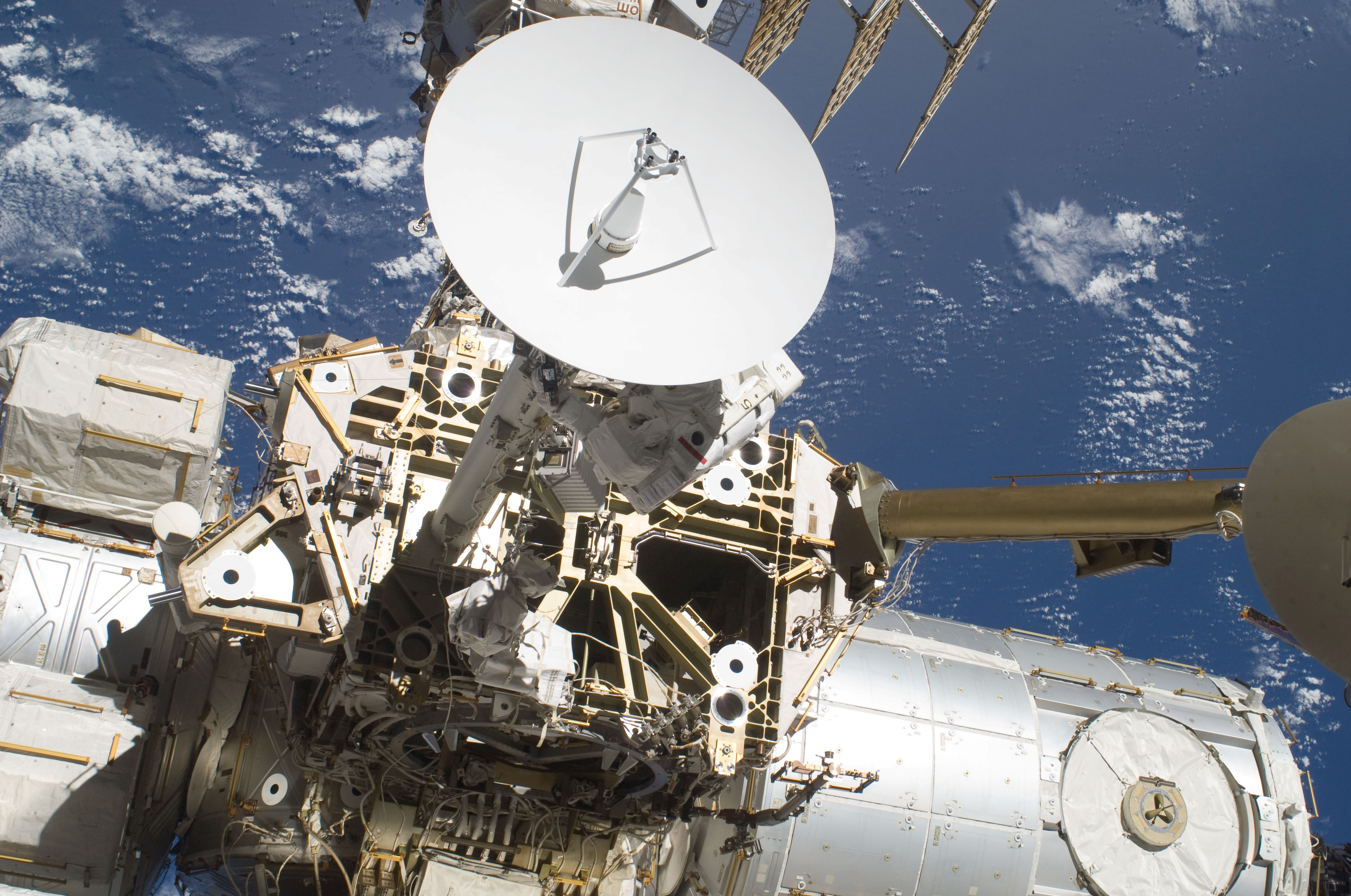
Ku band-antenna onboard ISS

Space research service (short: SRS, also: space research radiocommunication service) is – according to Article 1.55 of the International Telecommunication Union's (ITU) Radio Regulations (RR) – defined as «A radiocommunication service in which spacecraft or other objects in space are used for scientific or technological research purposes.»

See also

== Frequency allocation ==
The allocation of radio frequencies is provided according to Article 5 of the ITU Radio Regulations (edition 2012).

In order to improve harmonisation in spectrum utilisation, the majority of service-allocations stipulated in this document were incorporated in national Tables of Frequency Allocations and Utilisations which is with-in the responsibility of the appropriate national administration. The allocation might be primary, secondary, exclusive, and shared.

- primary allocation: is indicated by writing in capital letters (see example below)
- secondary allocation: is indicated by small letters (see example below)
- exclusive or shared utilization: is within the responsibility of administrations

Example of frequency allocation

Allocation to services
Region 1	Region 2	Region 3
13.4-13.75 GHz EARTH EXPLORATION-SATELLITE (active); RADIOLOCATION; SPACE RESEARCH; Standard frequency and time signal-satellite (Earth-to-space)
14–14.25 GHz FIXED-SATELLITE (Earth-to-space); RADIONAVIGATION; Mobile-satellite (Earth-to-space); Space research
14.25–14.3 GHz FIXED-SATELLITE (Earth-to-space); RADIONAVIGATION; Mobile-satellite (Earth-to-space); Space research

== References / sources ==
- International Telecommunication Union (ITU)
