= Frequency allocation =

Allocation and regulation of the electromagnetic spectrum into radio frequency bands

US frequency allocations chart, 2025

Frequency allocation (or spectrum allocation) is the part of spectrum management dealing with the designation and regulation of the electromagnetic spectrum into frequency bands, normally done by governments in most countries. Because radio propagation does not stop at national boundaries, governments have sought to harmonise the allocation of RF bands and their standardization.

== ITU definition ==
The International Telecommunication Union defines frequency allocation as being of "a given frequency band for the purpose of its use by one or more terrestrial or space radiocommunication services or the radio astronomy service under specified conditions".

Frequency allocation is also a special term, used in national frequency administration. Other terms are:

ITU-terms pertaining to frequency regulation
Frequency distribution to:	ITU languages						ITU RR (article)
Frequency distribution to:	French	English	Spanish	Arabic	Chinese	Russian	ITU RR (article)
Radiocommunication services	attribution (attribuer)	allocation (to allocate)	atribución (atribuir)		划分	распределение (распределять)	1.16
Regions or countries	allotissement (allotir)	allotment (to allot)	adjudicación (adjudicar)		分配	выделение (выделять)	1.17
Radio stations	assignation (assigner)	assignment (to assign)	asignación (asignar)		指配	присвоение (присваивать)	1.18

== Bodies ==
Several bodies set standards for frequency allocation, including:

- International Telecommunication Union (ITU)
- European Conference of Postal and Telecommunications Administrations (CEPT)
- Inter-American Telecommunication Commission (CITEL)

To improve harmonisation in spectrum utilisation, most service allocations are incorporated in national Tables of Frequency Allocations and Utilisations within the responsibility of the appropriate national administration. Allocations are:

- primary
- secondary
- exclusive or shared utilization, within the responsibility of national administrations.

Allocations of military usage will be in accordance with the ITU Radio Regulations. In NATO countries, military mobile utilizations are made in accordance with the NATO Joint Civil/Military Frequency Agreement (NJFA).

== Examples ==
Some of the bands listed (e.g., amateur 1.8–29.7 MHz) have gaps / are not continuous allocations.

Common frequencies
Source	Frequency (MHz)	Typical radiated power (kW)	Wavelength (meters) (approx)
Longwave BCB (EU)	0.150–0.285	320	
AM BCB (EU & J)	0.525–1.605	500	630
AM BCB (US)	0.530–1.710	50	
Amateur	1.8–29.7	0.16 (mobile)	15
Citizens band	26.9–27.4	0.004	12
Amateur	28–30	0.2 (mobile)	10
Land mobile	29–54	0.1	
Amateur	50–54	0.2 (mobile)	6
TV low VHF	54–88	100	
Land mobile (EU)	65–85	0.1	
FM BCB (J)	76–90	44	
FM BCB (US & EU)	88–108	105	
Aircraft	108–136	1	
Land mobile (EU)	120–160	0.1	
Land mobile	132–174	18–100	
Land mobile (J)	142–170		
Amateur	144–148	0.2 (mobile)	2
TV high VHF	174–216	316	
Land mobile	216–222	0.2	
Amateur	222–225	0.1 (mobile)	1.25
Land mobile (J)	335–384		
Land mobile	406–512	0.1	
Land mobile (J)	450–470		.70
Amateur	430–450	0.1 (mobile)	
TV UHF	470–806	5000	
Land mobile	806–947	0.035	.33
Cellular AMPS	806–947	0.003	.33
Amateur; Land mobile GPS	1200–1600		.23
Cellular PCS	1700–2000	0.003	
ISM; Bluetooth; Wi-Fi	2400–2500	0.0000025	

- BCB is an abbreviation for broadcast band, for commercial radio news and music broadcasts.

== See also ==
- Spectrum management
- Amateur radio frequency allocations
