= Wireless communication =

Transfer of information or power that does not require the use of physical wires

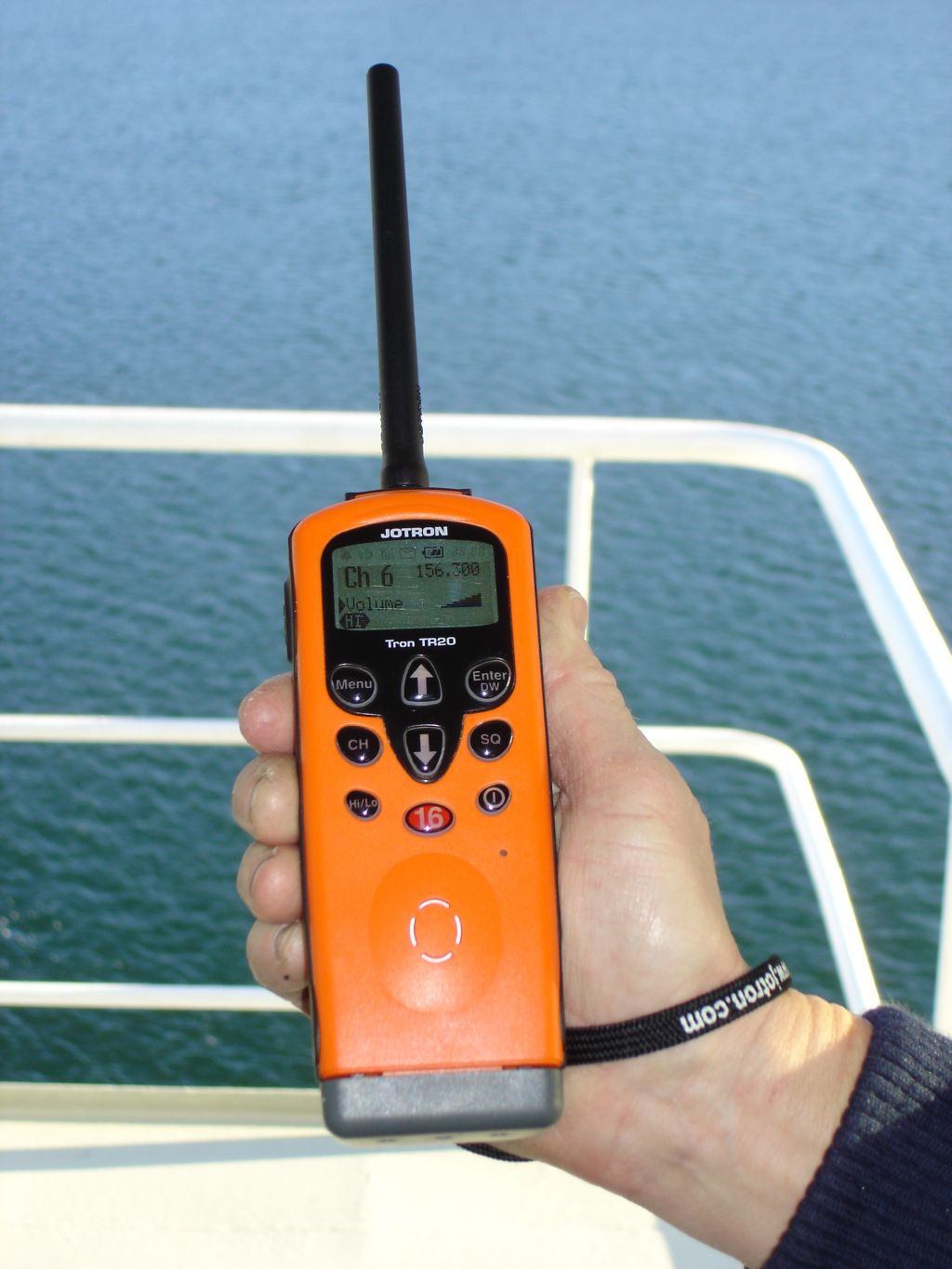
A handheld on-board communication station of the maritime mobile service

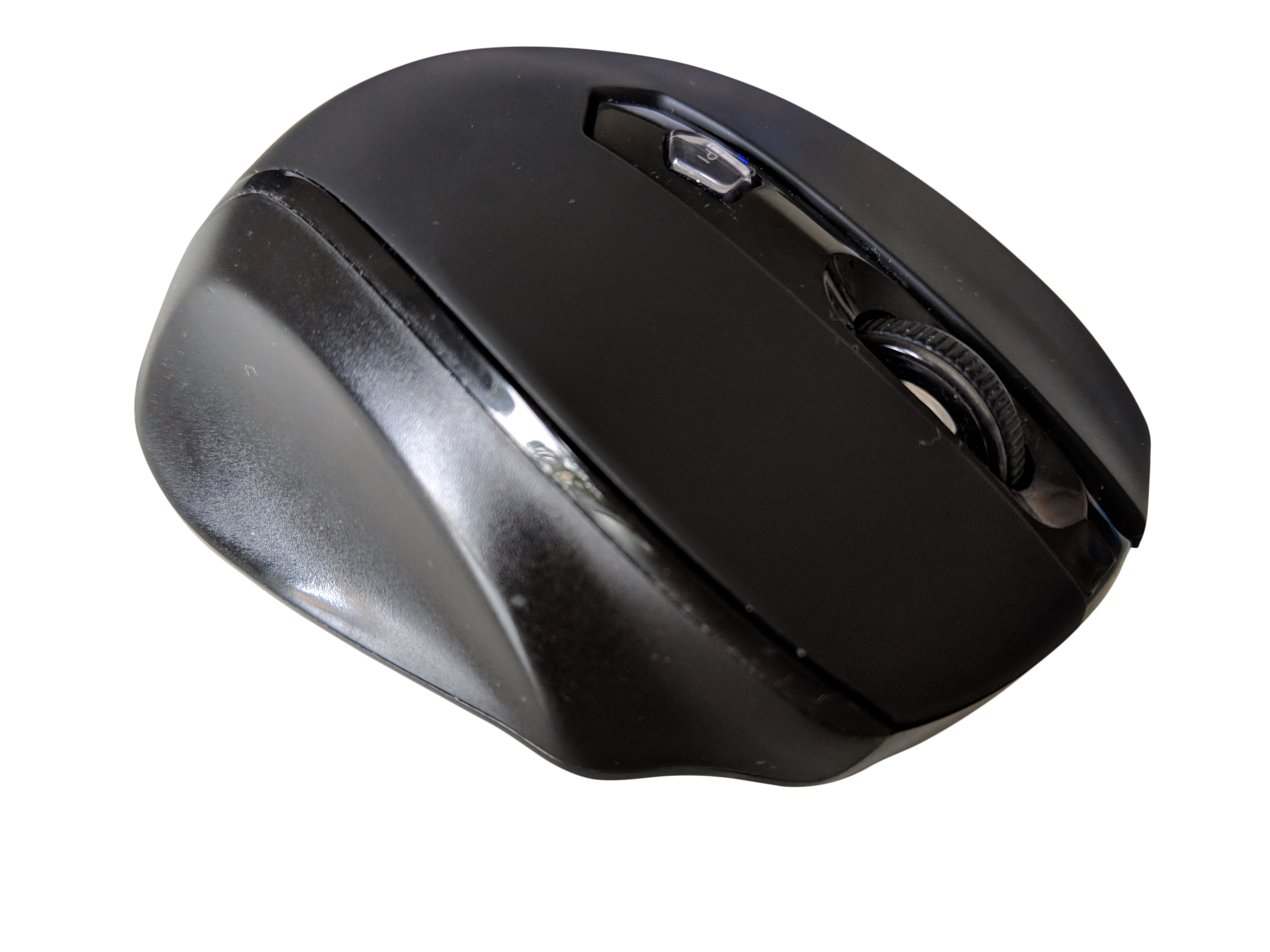
Wireless mouse

Wireless communication (or just wireless, when the context allows) is the transfer of information (telecommunication) between two or more points without the use of an electrical conductor, optical fiber or other continuous guided medium for the transfer. The most common wireless technologies use radio waves. With radio waves, intended distances can be short, such as a few meters for Bluetooth, or as far as millions of kilometers for deep-space radio communications. It encompasses various types of fixed, mobile, and portable applications, including two-way radios, cellular telephones, and wireless networking. Other examples of applications of radio wireless technology include GPS units, garage door openers, wireless computer mice, keyboards and headsets, headphones, radio receivers, satellite television, broadcast television and cordless telephones. Somewhat less common methods of achieving wireless communications involve other electromagnetic phenomena, such as light and magnetic or electric fields, or the use of sound.

The term wireless has been used twice in communications history, with slightly different meanings. It was initially used from about 1890 for the first radio transmitting and receiving technology, as in wireless telegraphy, until the new word radio replaced it around 1920. Radio sets in the UK and the English-speaking world that were not portable continued to be referred to as wireless sets into the 1960s. The term wireless was revived in the 1980s and 1990s mainly to distinguish digital devices that communicate without wires, such as the examples listed in the previous paragraph, from those that require wires or cables. This became its primary usage in the 2000s, due to the advent of technologies such as mobile broadband, Wi-Fi, and Bluetooth.

Wireless operations permit services, such as mobile and interplanetary communications, that are impossible or impractical to implement with the use of wires. The term is commonly used in the telecommunications industry to refer to telecommunications systems (e.g. radio transmitters and receivers, remote controls, etc.) that use some form of energy (e.g. radio waves and acoustic energy) to transfer information without the use of wires. Information is transferred in this manner over both short and long distances.

== History ==
=== Photophone ===
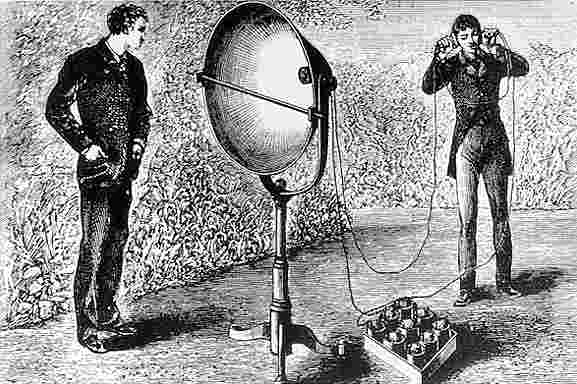
Bell and Tainter's photophone, of 1880

The first wireless telephone conversation occurred in 1880 when Alexander Graham Bell and Charles Sumner Tainter invented the photophone, a telephone that sent audio over a beam of light. The photophone required sunlight to operate, and a clear line of sight between the transmitter and receiver, which greatly decreased the viability of the photophone in any practical use. It would be several decades before the photophone's principles found their first practical applications in military communications and later in fiber-optic communications.

=== Electric wireless technology ===
==== Early wireless ====
A number of wireless electrical signaling schemes including sending electric currents through water and the ground using electrostatic and electromagnetic induction were investigated for telegraphy in the late 19th century before practical radio systems became available. These included a patented induction system by Thomas Edison allowing a telegraph on a running train to connect with telegraph wires running parallel to the tracks, a William Preece induction telegraph system for sending messages across bodies of water, and several operational and proposed telegraphy and voice earth conduction systems.

The Edison system was used by stranded trains during the Great Blizzard of 1888 and earth conductive systems found limited use between trenches during World War I but these systems were never successful economically.

==== Radio waves ====
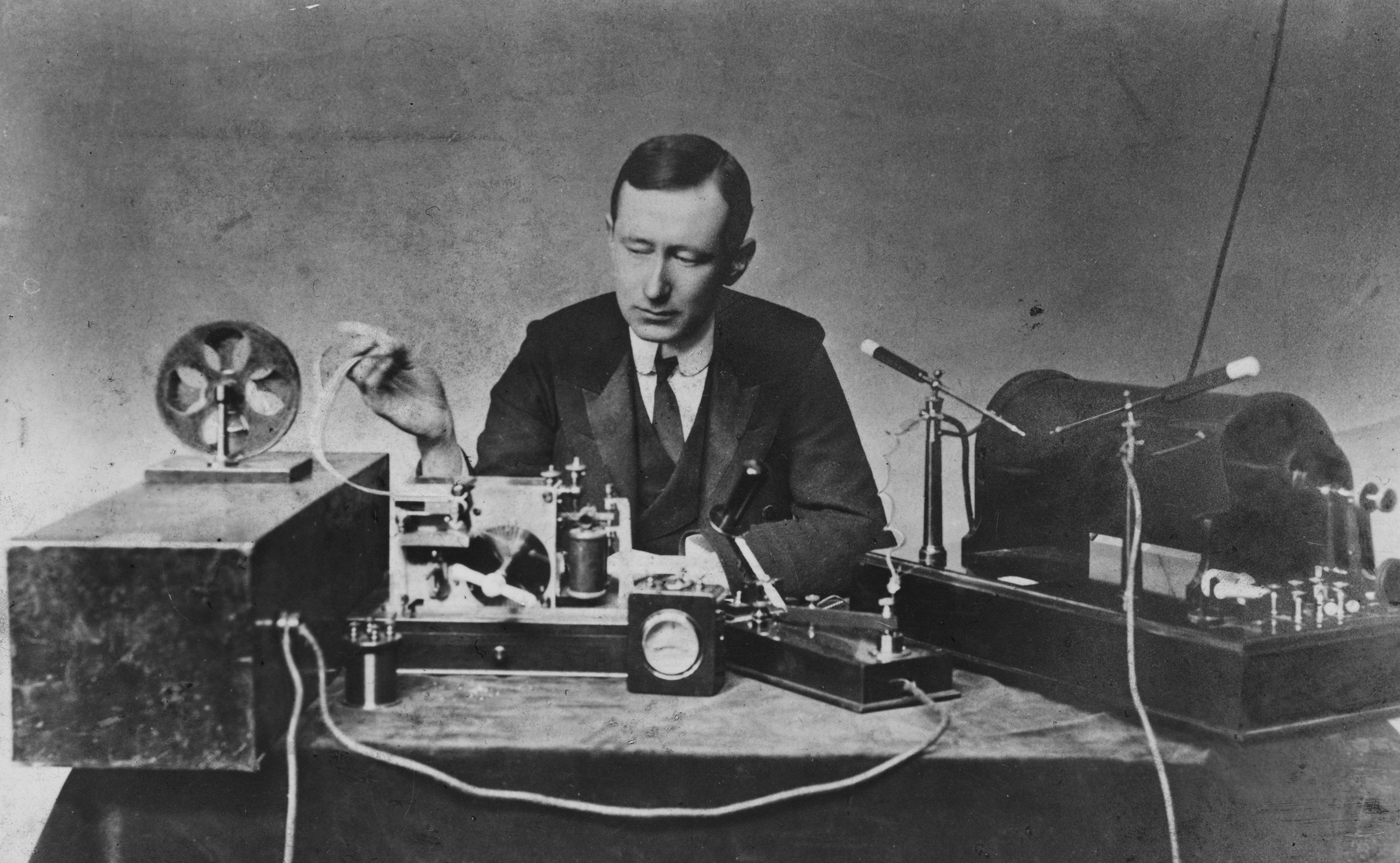
Marconi transmitting the first radio signal across the Atlantic

In 1894, Guglielmo Marconi began developing a wireless telegraph system using radio waves, which had been known about since proof of their existence in 1888 by Heinrich Hertz, but discounted as a communication format since they seemed, at the time, to be a short-range phenomenon. Marconi soon developed a system that was transmitting signals way beyond distances anyone could have predicted (due in part to the signals bouncing off the then unknown ionosphere). Marconi and Karl Ferdinand Braun were awarded the 1909 Nobel Prize for Physics for their contribution to this form of wireless telegraphy.

In 1898, Nikola Tesla demonstrated the first radio-controlled vessel at Madison Square Garden. It was a 4-foot long “teleautomaton” boat controlled via a wireless box with levers. The small boat used radio waves to operate its propeller, rudders, and lights. The audience was reportedly astonished, with some speculating the boat was being controlled by magic, telepathy, or a trained monkey inside. Tesla attempted to pitch his invention to the United States Navy as a radio-controlled torpedo or weaponized drone. However, the Navy was seemingly unimpressed by the idea.

Millimetre wave communication was first investigated by Jagadish Chandra Bose during 1894–1896, when he reached an extremely high frequency of up to 60 GHz in his experiments. He also introduced the use of semiconductor junctions to detect radio waves, when he patented the radio crystal detector in 1901.

=== Wireless revolution ===
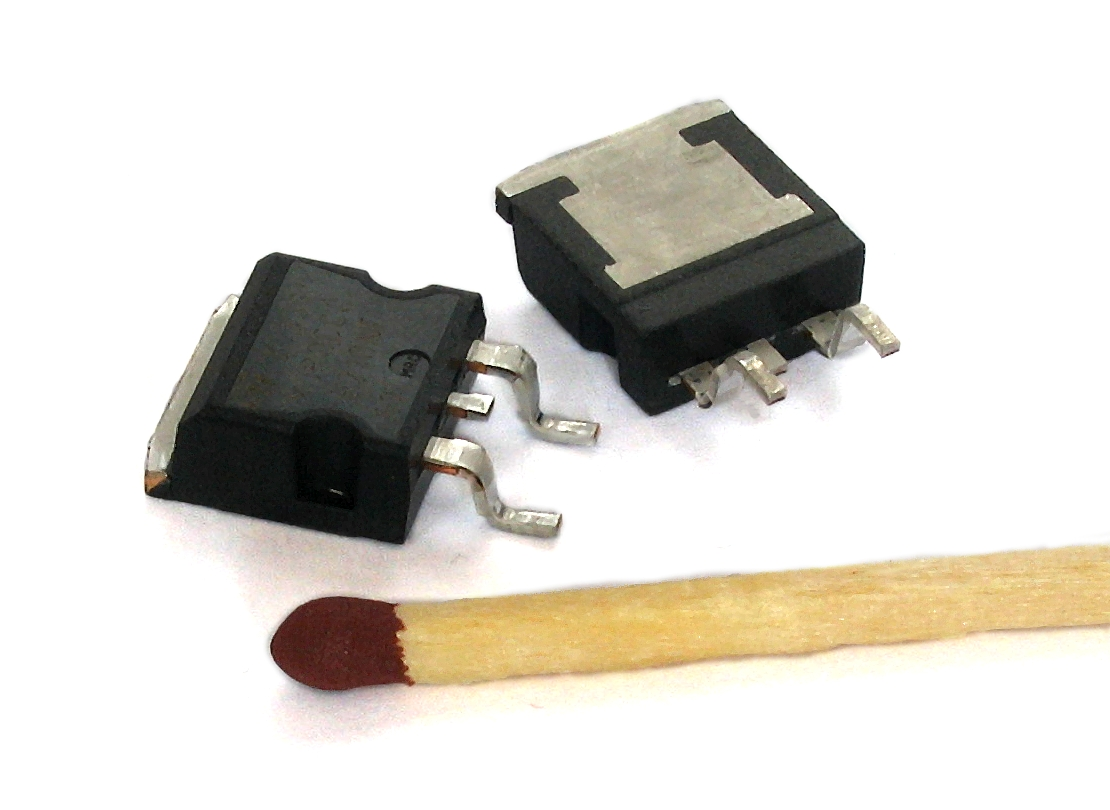
Power MOSFETs, which are used in RF power amplifiers to boost radio frequency (RF) signals in long-distance wireless networks

The wireless revolution began in the 1990s, with the advent of digital wireless networks leading to a social revolution, and a paradigm shift from wired to wireless technology, including the proliferation of commercial wireless technologies such as cell phones, mobile telephony, pagers, wireless computer networks, cellular networks, the wireless Internet, and laptop and handheld computers with wireless connections. The wireless revolution has been driven by advances in radio frequency (RF), microelectronics, and microwave engineering, and the transition from analog to digital RF technology, which enabled a substantial increase in voice traffic along with the delivery of digital data such as text messaging, images and streaming media.

== Modes ==
Wireless communications can be via:

=== Radio ===
Radio and microwave communication carry information by modulating properties of electromagnetic waves transmitted through space. Specifically, the transmitter generates artificial electromagnetic waves by applying time-varying electric currents to its antenna. The waves travel away from the antenna until they eventually reach the antenna of a receiver, which induces an electric current in the receiving antenna. This current can be detected and demodulated to recreate the information sent by the transmitter.

=== Wireless optical ===
Optical wireless communications (OWC) is a form of optical communication in which unguided light is used "in the air" (or in outer space), without an optical fiber. Visible, infrared (IR), or ultraviolet (UV) light is used to carry a Wireless signal. It is generally used in short-range communication; extensions exist for long-range and ultra-long range.

OWC systems operating in the visible band (390–750 nm) are commonly referred to as visible light communication (VLC). VLC systems take advantage of light-emitting diodes (LEDs) which can be pulsed at very high speeds without a noticeable effect on the lighting output and human eye. VLC can be possibly used in a wide range of applications including wireless local area networks, wireless personal area networks and vehicular networks, among others. On the other hand, terrestrial point-to-point OWC systems, also known as the free space optical (FSO) systems, operate at the near IR frequencies (750–1600 nm). These systems typically use laser transmitters and offer a cost-effective protocol-transparent link with high data rates, i.e., 10 Gbit/s per wavelength, and provide a potential solution for the backhaul bottleneck.

There has also been a growing interest in ultraviolet communication (UVC) as a result of recent progress in solid-state optical sources/detectors operating within solar-blind UV spectrum (200–280 nm). In this so-called deep UV band, solar radiation is negligible at the ground level and this makes possible the design of photon-counting detectors with wide field-of-view receivers that increase the received energy with little additional background noise. Such designs are particularly useful for outdoor non-line-of-sight configurations to support low-power short-range UVC such as in wireless sensors and ad-hoc networks.

==== Free-space optical (long-range) ====
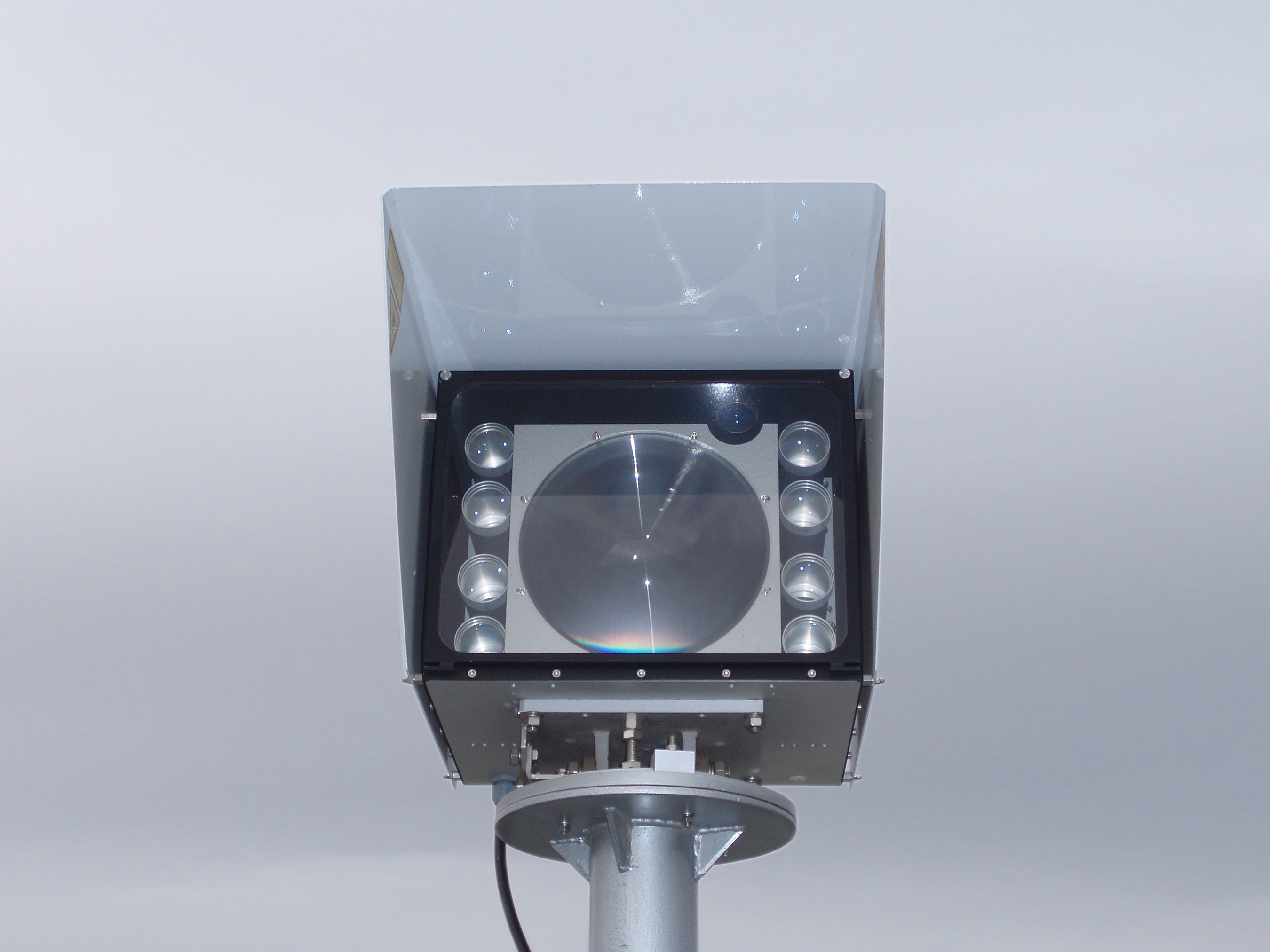
An 8-beam free space optics laser link, rated for 1 Gbit/s at a distance of approximately 2 km. The receptor is the large disc in the middle, and the transmitters are the smaller ones. To the top and right corner is a monocular for assisting the alignment of the two heads.

Free-space optical communication (FSO) is an optical communication technology that uses light propagating in free space to transmit wireless data for telecommunications or computer networking. "Free space" means the light beams travel through the open air or outer space. This contrasts with other communication technologies that use light beams traveling through transmission lines such as optical fiber or dielectric "light pipes".

The technology is useful where physical connections are impractical due to high costs or other considerations. For example, free space optical links are used in cities between office buildings that are not wired for networking, where the cost of running cable through the building and under the street would be prohibitive. Another widely used example is consumer IR devices such as remote controls and IrDA (Infrared Data Association) networking, which is used as an alternative to WiFi networking to allow laptops, PDAs, printers, and digital cameras to exchange data.

=== Sonic ===
Sonic, especially ultrasonic short-range communication involves the transmission and reception of sound.

=== Electromagnetic induction ===
Electromagnetic induction only allows short-range communication and power transmission. It has been used in biomedical situations such as pacemakers, as well as for short-range RFID tags.

== Services ==
Common examples of wireless equipment include:

- Infrared and ultrasonic remote control devices
- Professional LMR (Land Mobile Radio) and SMR (Specialized Mobile Radio) are typically used by business, industrial, and Public Safety entities.
- Consumer Two-way radio including FRS Family Radio Service, GMRS (General Mobile Radio Service), and Citizens band ("CB") radios.
- The Amateur Radio Service (Ham radio).
- Consumer and professional Marine VHF radios.
- Airband and radio navigation equipment used by aviators and air traffic control
- Cellular telephones and pagers: provide connectivity for portable and mobile applications, both personal and business.
- Global Positioning System (GPS): allows drivers of cars and trucks, captains of boats and ships, and pilots of aircraft to ascertain their location anywhere on earth.
- Cordless computer peripherals: the cordless mouse is a common example; wireless headphones, keyboards, and printers can also be linked to a computer via wireless using technology such as Wireless USB or Bluetooth.
- Cordless telephone sets: these are limited-range devices, not to be confused with cell phones.
- Satellite television: Is broadcast from satellites in geostationary orbit. Typical services use direct broadcast satellite to provide multiple television channels to viewers.

== Electromagnetic spectrum ==
AM and FM radios and other electronic devices make use of the electromagnetic spectrum. The frequencies of the radio spectrum that are available for use for communication are treated as a public resource and are regulated by organizations such as the American Federal Communications Commission, Ofcom in the United Kingdom, the international ITU-R or the European ETSI. Their regulations determine which frequency ranges can be used for what purpose and by whom. In the absence of such control or alternative arrangements such as a privatized electromagnetic spectrum, chaos might result if, for example, airlines did not have specific frequencies to work under and an amateur radio operator was interfering with a pilot's ability to land an aircraft. Wireless communication spans the spectrum from 9 kHz to 300 GHz.

== Applications ==
=== Mobile telephones ===
One of the best-known examples of wireless technology is the mobile phone, also known as a cellular phone, with more than 6.6 billion mobile cellular subscriptions worldwide as of the end of 2010. These wireless phones use radio waves from signal-transmission towers to enable their users to make phone calls from many locations worldwide. They can be used within the range of the mobile telephone site used to house the equipment required to transmit and receive the radio signals from these instruments.

=== Data communications ===
Wireless data communications allow wireless networking between desktop computers, laptops, tablet computers, cell phones, and other related devices. The various available technologies differ in local availability, coverage range, and performance, and in some circumstances, users employ multiple connection types and switch between them using connection manager software or a mobile VPN to handle the multiple connections as a secure, single virtual network. Supporting technologies include:

Wi-Fi is a wireless local area network that enables portable computing devices to connect easily with other devices, peripherals, and the Internet. Standardized as IEEE 802.11 a, b, g, n, ac, ax, Wi-Fi has link speeds similar to older standards of wired Ethernet. Wi-Fi has become the de facto standard for access in private homes, within offices, and at public hotspots. Some businesses charge customers a monthly fee for service, while others have begun offering it free in an effort to increase the sales of their goods.

Cellular data service offers coverage within a range of 10–15 miles from the nearest cell site. Speeds have increased as technologies have evolved, from earlier technologies such as GSM, CDMA and GPRS, through 3G, to 4G networks such as W-CDMA, EDGE or CDMA2000. As of 2026, 5G is now used.

Low-power wide-area networks (LPWAN) bridge the gap between Wi-Fi and Cellular for low-bitrate Internet of things (IoT) applications.
Mobile-satellite communications may be used where other wireless connections are unavailable, such as in largely rural areas or remote locations. Satellite communications are especially important for transportation, aviation, maritime and military use.

Wireless sensor networks are responsible for sensing noise, interference, and activity in data collection networks. This allows us to detect relevant quantities, monitor and collect data, formulate clear user displays, and to perform decision-making functions

Wireless data communications are used to span a distance beyond the capabilities of typical cabling in point-to-point communication and point-to-multipoint communication, to provide a backup communications link in case of normal network failure, to link portable or temporary workstations, to overcome situations where normal cabling is difficult or financially impractical, or to remotely connect mobile users or networks.

==== Peripherals ====
Peripheral devices in computing can also be connected wirelessly, as part of a Wi-Fi network or directly via an optical or radio-frequency (RF) peripheral interface. Originally these units used bulky, highly local transceivers to mediate between a computer and a keyboard and mouse; however, more recent generations have used smaller, higher-performance devices. Radio-frequency interfaces, such as Bluetooth or Wireless USB, provide greater ranges of efficient use, usually up to 10 feet, but distance, physical obstacles, competing signals, and even human bodies can all degrade the signal quality. Concerns about the security of wireless keyboards arose at the end of 2007 when it was revealed that Microsoft's implementation of encryption in some of its 27 MHz models were highly insecure.

=== Energy transfer ===
Wireless energy transfer is a process whereby electrical energy is transmitted from a power source to an electrical load that does not have a built-in power source, without the use of interconnecting wires. There are two different fundamental methods for wireless energy transfer. Energy can be transferred using either far-field methods that involve beaming power/lasers, radio or microwave transmissions, or near-field using electromagnetic induction. Wireless energy transfer may be combined with wireless information transmission in what is known as Wireless Powered Communication. In 2015, researchers at the University of Washington demonstrated far-field energy transfer using Wi-Fi signals to power cameras.

=== Medical technologies ===
New wireless technologies, such as mobile body area networks (MBAN), have the capability to monitor blood pressure, heart rate, oxygen level, and body temperature. The MBAN works by sending low-powered wireless signals to receivers that feed into nursing stations or monitoring sites. This technology helps with the intentional and unintentional risk of infection or disconnection that arise from wired connections.

== Categories of implementations, devices, and standards ==
- Cellular networks: 0G, 1G, 2G, 3G, 4G, 5G, 6G
- Cordless telephony: DECT (Digital Enhanced Cordless Telecommunications)
- Land Mobile Radio or Professional Mobile Radio: TETRA, P25, OpenSky, EDACS, DMR, dPMR
- List of emerging technologies
- Radio station in accordance with ITU RR (article 1.61)
- Radiocommunication service in accordance with ITU RR (article 1.19)
- Radio communication system
- Short-range point-to-point communication: Wireless microphones, Remote controls, IrDA, RFID (Radio Frequency Identification), TransferJet, Wireless USB, DSRC (Dedicated Short Range Communications), EnOcean, Near Field Communication
- Wireless sensor networks: Zigbee, EnOcean; Personal area networks, Bluetooth, TransferJet, Ultra-wideband (UWB from WiMedia Alliance).
- Wireless networks: Wireless LAN (WLAN), (IEEE 802.11 branded as Wi-Fi and HiperLAN), Wireless Metropolitan Area Networks (WMAN) and (LMDS, WiMAX, and HiperMAN)

== See also ==
- Comparison of wireless data standards
- Digital radio
- Hotspot (Wi-Fi)
- ISO 15118 (Vehicle to Grid)
- Li-Fi
- MiFi
- Mobile (disambiguation)
- Radio antenna
- Radio resource management (RRM)
- Timeline of radio
- Tuner (radio)
- Wireless access point
- Wireless security
- Wireless Wide Area Network (True wireless)
- WSSUS model
