= Port station =

Communications facility operating at a port

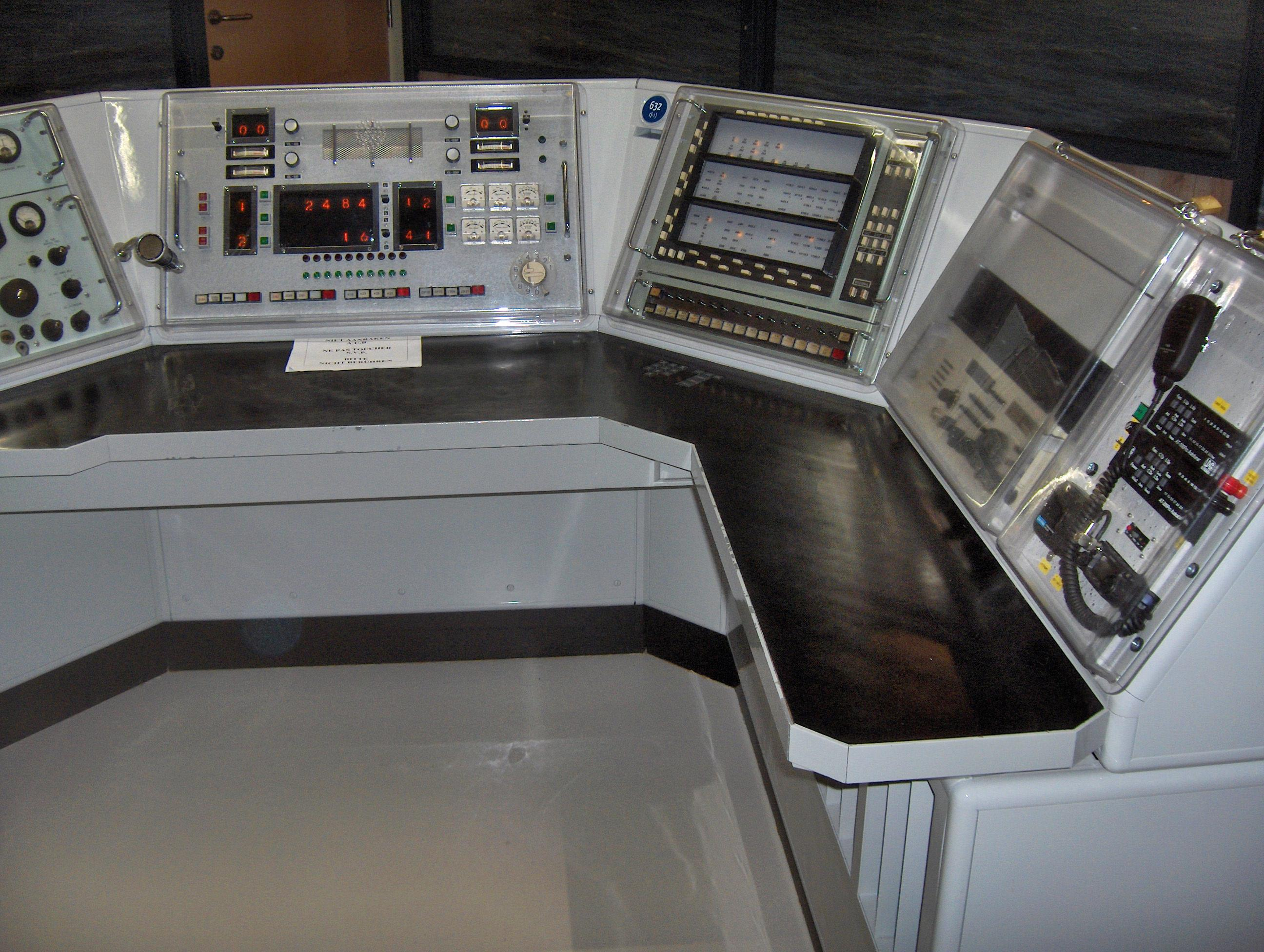
Former Belgium coast station, exposed in the National fishing-museum in Koksijde

Port station (also: port radio station) is – according to Article 1.80 of the International Telecommunication Union´s (ITU) RR – defined as "A coast station in the port operations service."

Each station shall be classified by the service in which it operates permanently or temporarily.

See also

== References / sources ==
- International Telecommunication Union (ITU)
