= Vessel traffic service =

Maritime traffic control system

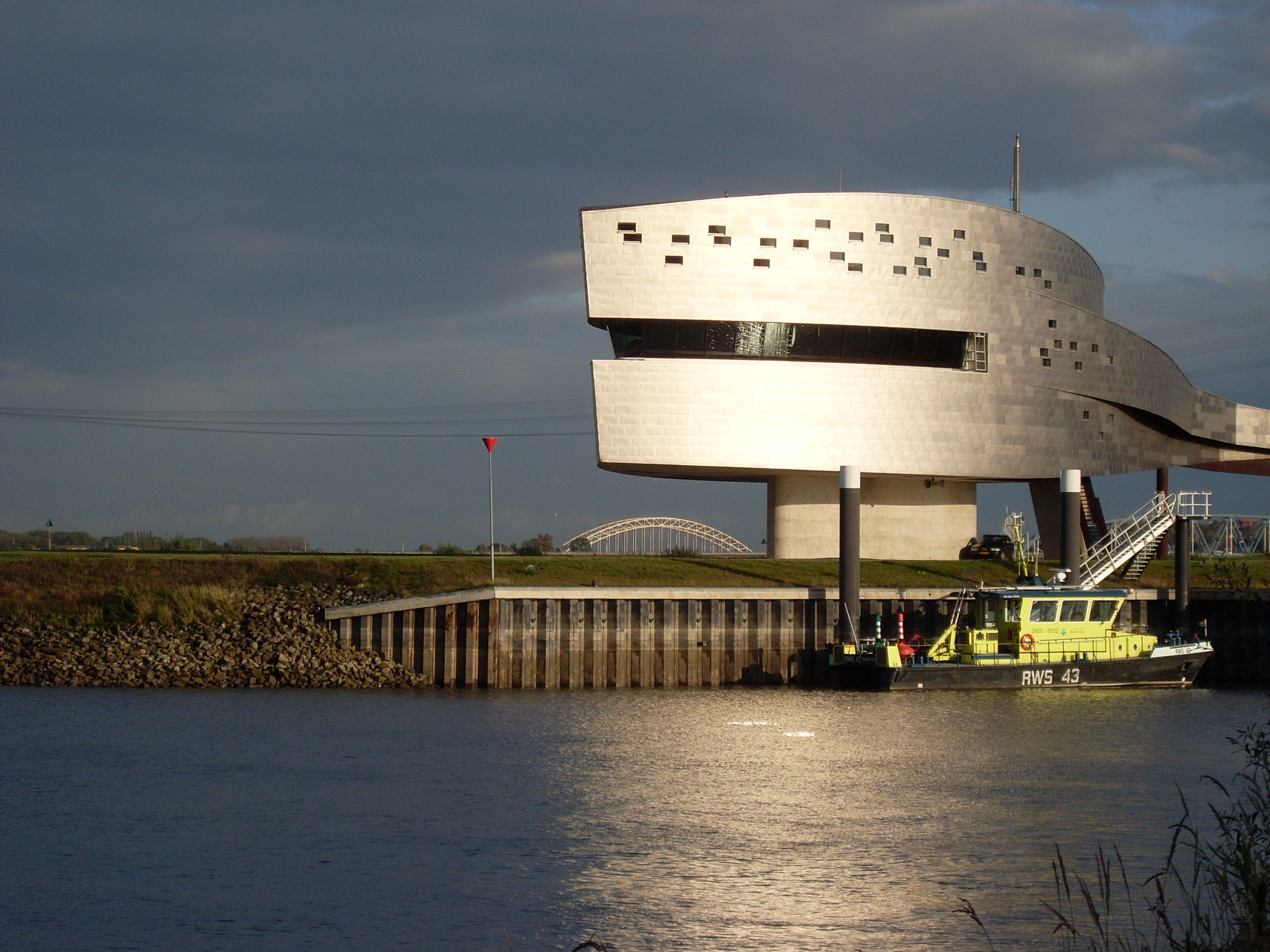
VTS Nijmegen, monitoring the river Waal in the Netherlands

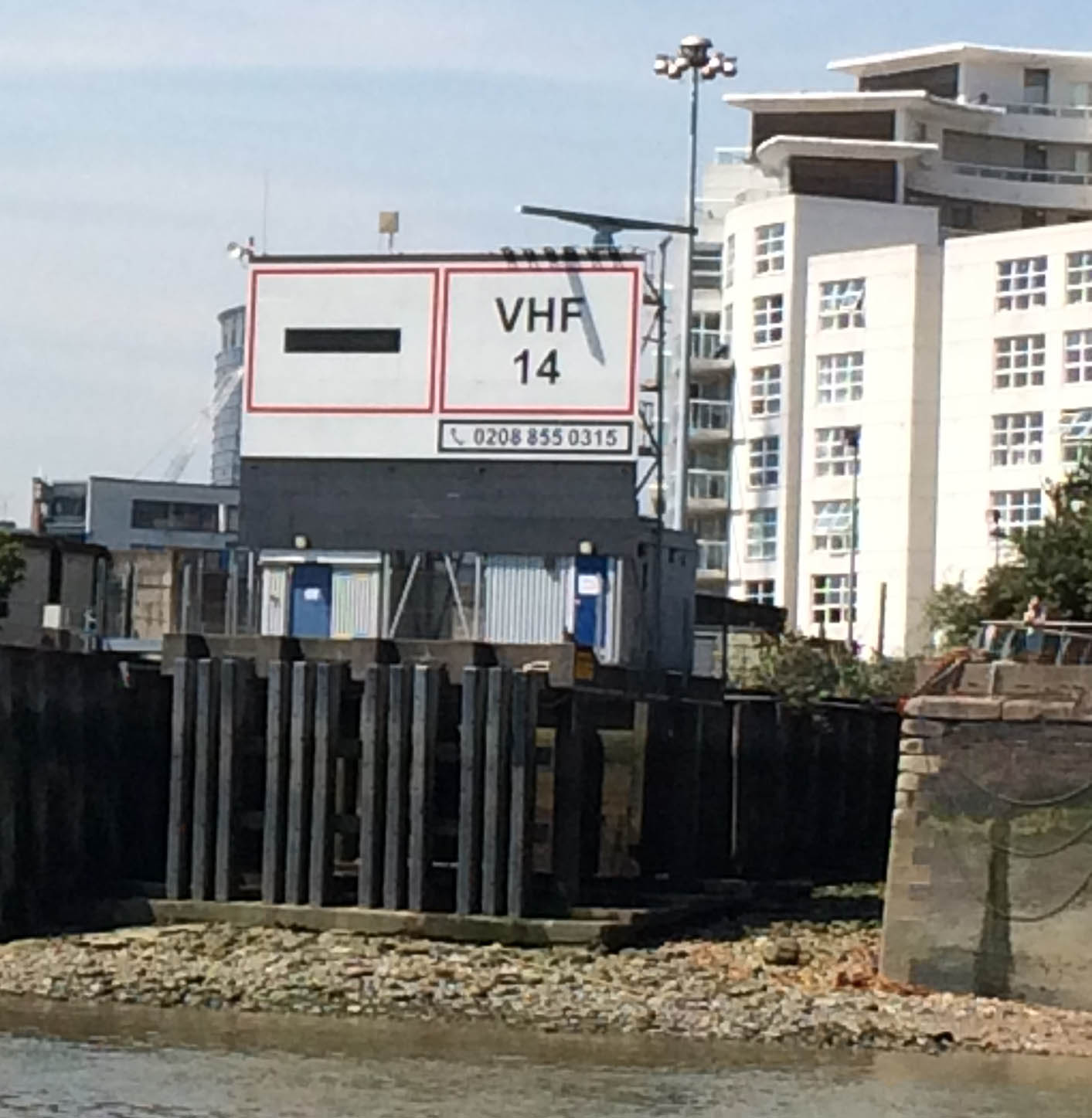
Sign telling mariners to contact the Port of London vessel traffic service as they enter the Thames Barrier control zone

A vessel traffic service is a marine traffic monitoring system established by harbour or port authorities, similar to air traffic control for aircraft. The International Maritime Organization defines vessel traffic service as "a service implemented by a competent authority designed to improve the safety and efficiency of vessel traffic and protect the environment. The service shall have the capability to interact with the traffic and respond to traffic situations developing in the vessel traffic service area". Typical vessel traffic service systems use radar, closed-circuit television, VHF radiotelephony and automatic identification system to keep track of vessel movements and provide navigational safety in a limited geographical area.

In the United States, vessel traffic services are established and operated by the Coast Guard Navigation Center. Some services operate as partnerships between the Coast Guard and private agencies.

== Personnel ==
Guidelines require that the vessel traffic service authority should be provided with sufficient staff, appropriately qualified, suitably trained and capable of performing the tasks required, taking into consideration the type and level of services to be provided in conformity with the current International Maritime Organization guidelines on the subject.

International Association of Marine Aids to Navigation and Lighthouse Authorities Recommendation V-103 is the recommendation on Standards for training and certification of vessel traffic service personnel. There are four associated model courses, V103/1 to V-103/4, which are approved by the International Maritime Organization and should be used when training personnel for the vessel traffic service qualifications.

== Information service ==
An information service is a service to ensure that essential information becomes available in time for onboard navigational decision-making.

The information service is provided by broadcasting information at fixed times and intervals or when deemed necessary by the vessel traffic service or at the request of a vessel, and may include for example reports on the position, identity and intentions of other traffic; waterway conditions; weather; hazards; or any other factors that may influence the vessel's transit.

== Traffic organization service ==
A traffic organization service is a service to prevent the development of dangerous maritime traffic situations and to provide for the safe and efficient movement of vessel traffic within the vessel traffic service area.

The traffic organization service concerns the operational management of traffic and the forward planning of vessel movements to prevent congestion and dangerous situations and is particularly relevant in times of high traffic density or when the movement of special transports may affect the flow of other traffic. The service may also include establishing and operating a system of traffic clearances or sailing plans, or both, in relation to priority of movements, allocation of space, mandatory reporting of movements in the service area, routes to be followed, speed limits to be observed or other appropriate measures which are considered necessary by the vessel traffic service authority.

== Navigational assistance service ==
Navigational assistance service is a service to assist onboard navigational decision-making and to monitor its effects.

The navigational assistance service is especially important in difficult navigational or meteorological circumstances or in case of defects or deficiencies. This service is normally rendered at the request of a vessel or by the vessel traffic service when deemed necessary.

== See also ==
- Automatic identification system
- Automatic Packet Reporting System
- Ship movement service
- Sea traffic management

== Gallery ==
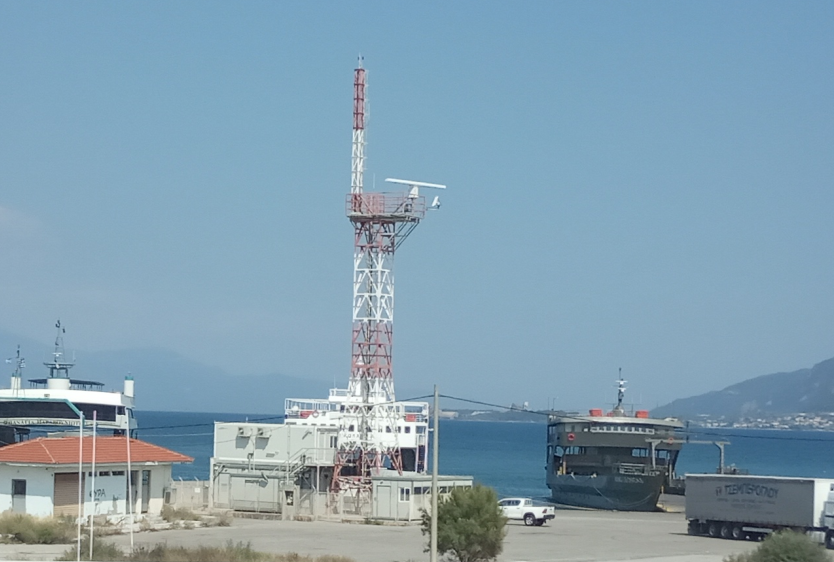
Antirrio RTS (Regional Traffic Service station), part of the national Vessel Traffic Service system of Greece.

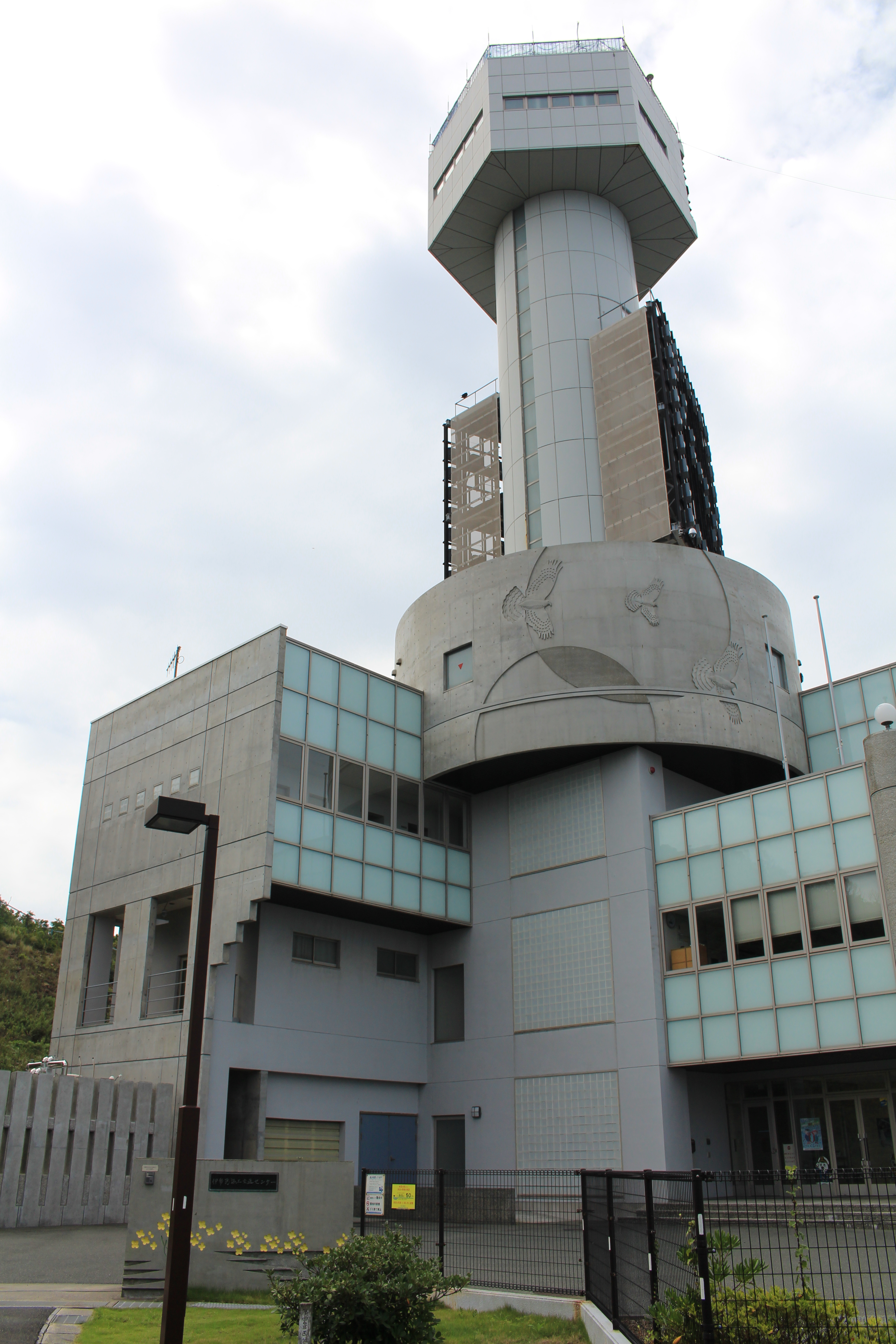
Ise Bay Vessel Traffic Service Centre in Cape Irago, Tahara, Aichi prefecture, Japan.

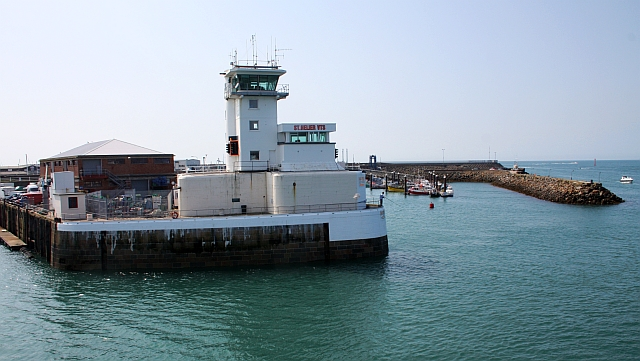
Saint Helier Vessel Traffic Service situated at the pier heads of St Helier harbor, Jersey

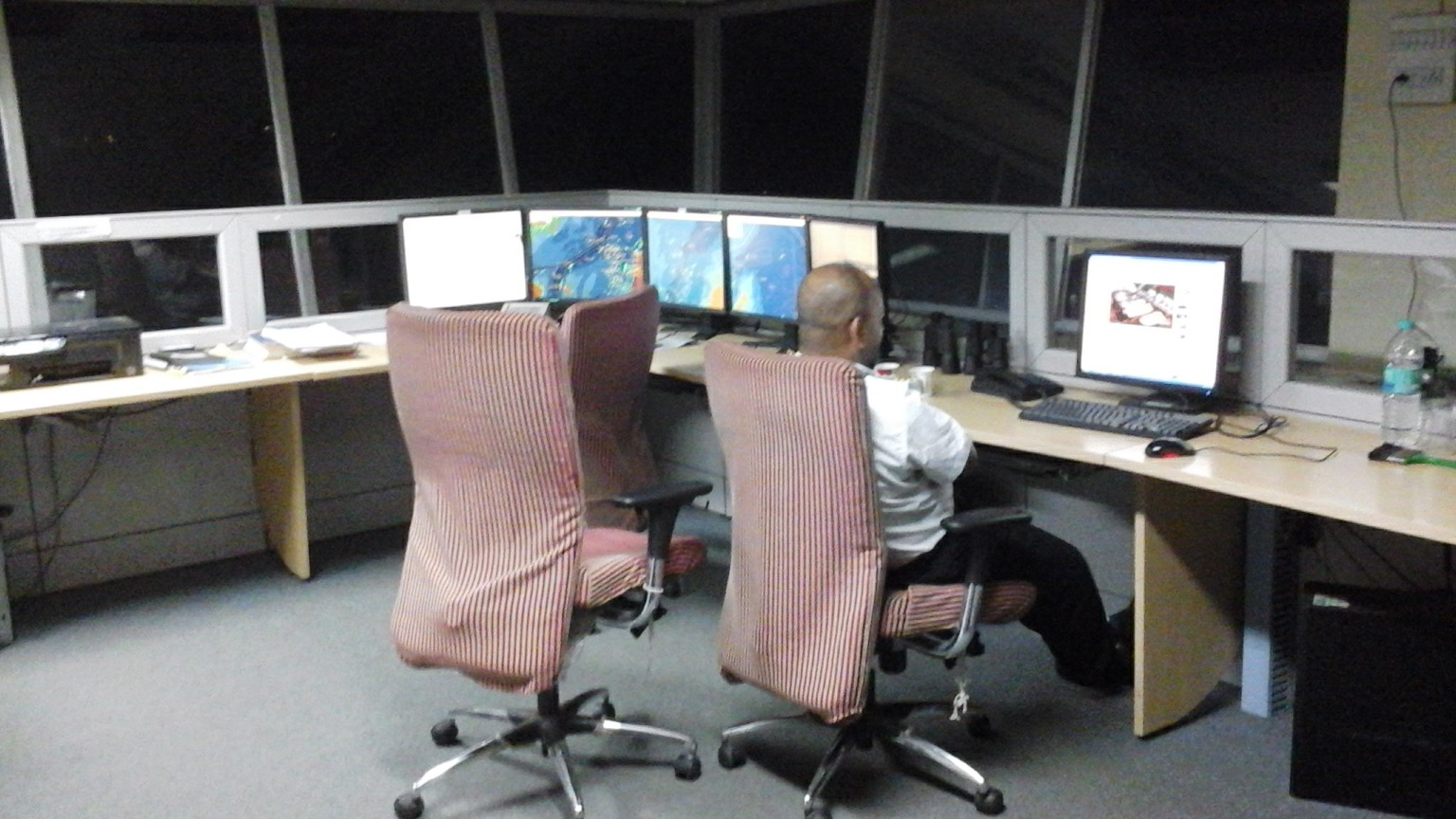
Inside the Mumbai Vessel Traffic Service, India

== Sources ==
Vessel Traffic Services manual, Edition 6 (2016), International Association of Marine Aids to Navigation and Lighthouse Authorities
