= Sea traffic management =

Sea traffic management (STM) is a methodology, developed by the Swedish Maritime Administration MonaLisa project, endorsed by the European Commission, sought to define a set of systems and procedures to guide and monitor sea traffic in a manner similar to air traffic management.

== Background ==
As of December 31, 2004, the International Maritime Organization established a regulation requiring automatic identification system (AIS) transponders to be installed onboard seagoing vessels.

== Concept ==
External videos
- MONALISA - Sea Traffic Management.

Even though the AIS gives every ship the means to track other ships, they are not able to deduce the intentions of other vessels given only information from the AIS. STM seeks to create an organized traffic management entity called Sea Traffic Coordination Center(STCC) that will act as a central hub maintaining a record of all vessels at sea using the AIS and/or radar, enabling the distribution of vessel routes between ship-to-ship and ship-to-shore.

The STCC together with the AIS and/or radar allows:

- route plans with regards to weather and geospatial limitations or vessel-related requirements can be readily generated.
- planned routes to be automatically monitored, allowing appropriate actions to be executed should the vessel stray off-course.
- collisions to be prevented as sharing of vessel coordinates allow routes to be modified with ease.
- ships can be offered pilot assistance in difficult-to-maneuver areas or whenever requested by the captain.
- captains are able to make educated navigation decisions in highly trafficked areas as data of the surrounding environment is readily distributed throughout the network.

== Definition ==
1. The aggregation of the seaborne and shore-based functions (sea traffic services, maritime space management, and sea traffic flow management) required to ensure the safe and efficient movement of vessels during all phases of operation.
2. The dynamic, integrated management of sea traffic and maritime space (including sea traffic services, management of the maritime space and sea traffic flow management)—safely, economically and efficiently—through the provision of facilities and seamless services in collaboration with all parties and involving seaborne and shore-based functions.

== Integration of the whole maritime logistics chain ==
STM seeks to create safe, efficient and environmentally friendly sea voyages. In order to utilize the full potential of STM, it must be developed to take into consideration the operations carried out at ports and beyond. Ports operations and the efficiency of which, are important factors in the performance of the transportation system as a whole. STM can contribute greatly to this area as it was conceived with an emphasis on efficient collaboration between operations at sea and on land.

Ports must smoothly coordinate ships reaching port, departing from the port as well as the loading and discharging of ships in relation to inbound and outbound transportation. This means that sea voyages must be in synchronization with port operations such that ship arrivals can be accurately predicted and prepared for. In STM the ambition is to enable this level of operation coordination by improving situational awareness through information sharing. The information needed may be included in the standardized route exchange protocol developed.

== See also ==
- Automatic identification system
- Air traffic management
- International Maritime Organization
- Long-range Identification and Tracking (LRIT)
- Navigation
- Swedish Maritime Administration
- Traffic Separation Scheme: traffic-lanes (or clearways) indicate the general direction of the ships in that zone
- Vessel traffic service
