= Maritime mobile service =

Mobile service among radio stations of coasts and ships

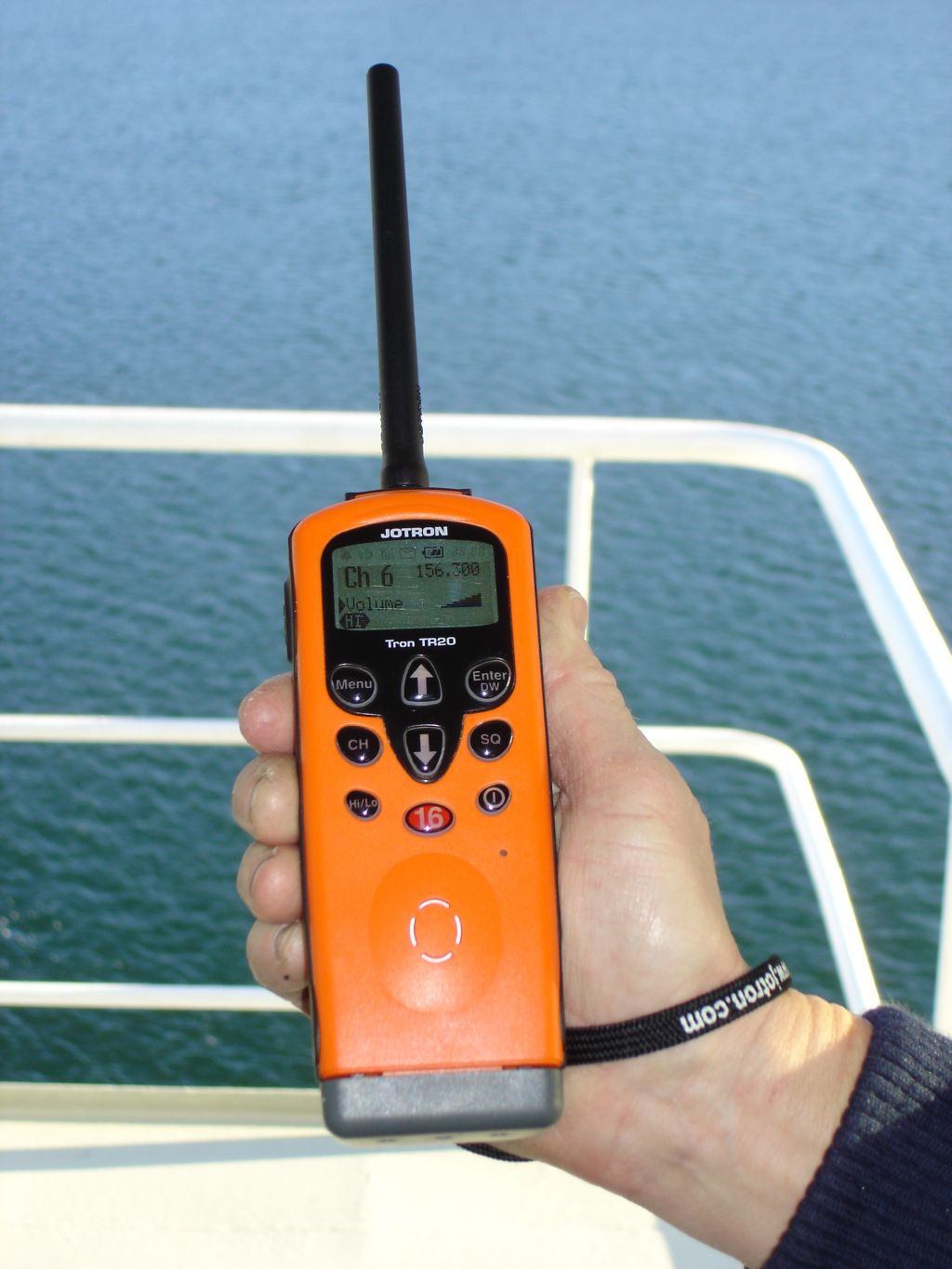
A handheld on-board communication station of the maritime mobile service

A maritime mobile service (also MMS or maritime mobile radiocommunication service) is a mobile service between coast stations and ship stations, or between ship stations, or between associated on-board communication stations. The service may also be used by survival craft stations and emergency position-indicating radiobeacon stations.

== Classification ==
This radiocommunication service is classified in accordance with ITU Radio Regulations (article 1) as follows:

- Maritime mobile service
  - Maritime mobile-satellite service (article 1.29)
  - Port operations service (article 1.30)
  - Ship movement service (article 1.31)

== Frequency allocation ==
The allocation of radio frequencies is provided according to Article 5 of the ITU Radio Regulations (edition 2012).

In order to improve harmonisation in spectrum utilisation, the majority of service-allocations stipulated in this document were incorporated in national Tables of Frequency Allocations and Utilisations which is with-in the responsibility of the appropriate national administration. The allocation might be primary, secondary, exclusive, and shared.

- primary allocation: is indicated by writing in capital letters (see example below)
- secondary allocation: is indicated by small letters
- exclusive or shared utilization: is within the responsibility of administrations

However, military usage, in bands where there is civil usage, will be in accordance with the ITU Radio Regulations. In NATO countries military utilizations will be in accordance with the NATO Joint Civil/Military Frequency Agreement (NJFA).

 Frequency range

     415... 495   kHz
     505...526,5  kHz
    1606,5...1625 kHz
    1635...1800   kHz
    2045...2160   kHz
    2170...2173,5 kHz
    2190,5...2194 kHz
    2625...2650   kHz
    4000...4438   kHz
    6200...6525   kHz
    8100...8815   kHz
   12230...13200  kHz
   16360...17410  kHz
   18780...18900  kHz
   19680...19800  kHz
   22000...22855  kHz
   25070...25210  kHz
   26100...26175  kHz

== See also ==
- Radio station
- Radiocommunication service
