= P2 – Svenskt Vrakskydd =

Organization for preservation of shipwrecks in Swedish waters

P2 – Svenskt Vrakskydd is an organization that was started by scuba divers. The purpose was to work for the preservation of shipwrecks in Swedish waters. The organization works through spreading information and debating. For example, the organization has produced a pamphlet for divers that is called “Wreck Ethics”. “Wreck Ethics” is about how to dive among wrecks carefully, with tips on how you anchor to do minimum damage possible on wrecks.

The main point of the organization is that shipwrecks are culture-treasures that generally should be preserved where they lie. Additionally they should be accessible to divers and scientists. The organization is pro wreck diving and primarily against salvaging from wrecks and unnecessary damaging.

== History ==
The organization started during the salvaging from the wreck after Hesperus at lighthouse “Märket” in the Baltic Sea. The act attracted a lot of attention, because of issues with the ship's bell. This operation was against a Swedish law named “Fornminneslagen” (cultural heritage law). The outcome of the debate that started in May 2002 was that a meeting was scheduled in June 2002 to form an association against salvaging from wrecks. An interim board was appointed on a second meeting in the end of July 2002

== Name ==
“Protect & Preserve - Svenskt Vrakskydd”, often abbreviated “P2 - Svenskt Vrakskydd” or just P2.

The name was a compromise during the founding of the association that later became permanent. The goal with the name was to have something that would be usable internationally, that it would be able to be abbreviated and that it would clearly state what the associations goal was and what geographic area it belonged to.

The later part of the name is in Swedish and means ”Swedish Wreck Protection”

== Goals ==
PRESERVE SHIPWRECKS IN SWEDISH WATERS

For diving experiences and historical values today and in the future

1. To be an association for divers and others that find an interest in shipwrecks and other remnants that lie in seas, lakes and watercourses.
2. Increase awareness of the cultural value in preserving wrecks in their natural environment.
3. Act for continued possibility to experience preserved wrecks through diving.
4. Act for actions that promote the preserving of wrecks on the sea floor.
5. Act for salvaging does only happen in alignment of Swedish law.
6. Act for cooperation between various organizations interested in the preservation of wrecks.
7. Being a lobbyist for promoting wreck preservation
8. Being a source of information regarding laws, regulations and rules concerning wrecks.

The goals of the association are guidelines for its activities and shall both lead the organization in its work, but also present what it stands for to outsiders.

== Activities ==
The association has since the beginning of its existence been an active debater in the subject of wrecks issues, this primarily through salvaging debates on the internet and the majority of the effort is spent on creating attention concerning the wreck issue. Among others, the association has participated in TV-interviews, participated in the boat and sea fair “Allt För Sjön 2005” and held lectures at various organizations. The association has also conducted some experiments with how to attach a buoy to a wreck, been consultative of the bill "Draft amendment of the Act (1988:950) of cultural heritage, etc. " (Government Offices Ku2008/2184/KT) and conducted member activities in the form of study visits. The association has also assisted in the writing of, been quoted in and written newspaper articles related to wreck and wreck diving.

The association tries to raise awareness of the wreck protection issue, promote wreck diving, as well as collaborate with other partners to achieve goals.

== Wreck Ethics ==
In 2003, the association launched a concept known as "Wreck Ethics" which is inspired by Swedish Maritime Administrations "Sjövett" (Sea Ethics). Wreck Ethics is six directions given with explanatory sub-headings on how to, with simple rules, minimize the adverse effects of diving on the wreck.

1. Inform yourself about the wreck – Find out the facts, conditions and local regulations
2. Don't anchor in the wreck – Use mooring methods that do not damage the wreck
3. Use the appropriate equipment – Adjust the equipment for wreck diving and current circumstances
4. Dive gently – Think of buoyancy, propulsion technique and minimize your contact with the wreck
5. Do not take anything from the wreck- Leave artifacts on site
6. Do not litter - Leave no trash and do not scribble

== Chairmen ==
- 2002–2008 – Mattias Paulsson
- 2009–2010 – Pär Ahlgren
