= WSSUS model =

The WSSUS (Wide-Sense Stationary Uncorrelated Scattering) model provides a statistical description of the transmission behavior of Wireless channels. "Wide-sense stationarity" means the second-order moments of the channel are stationary, which means that they depend only on the time difference, while "uncorrelated scattering" refers to the delay τ due to scatterers. Modelling of mobile channels as WSSUS (wide sense stationary uncorrelated scattering) has become popular among specialists. The model was introduced by Phillip A. Bello in 1963.

A commonly used description of time variant channel applies the set of Bello functions and the theory of stochastic processes.
