= Ship movement service =

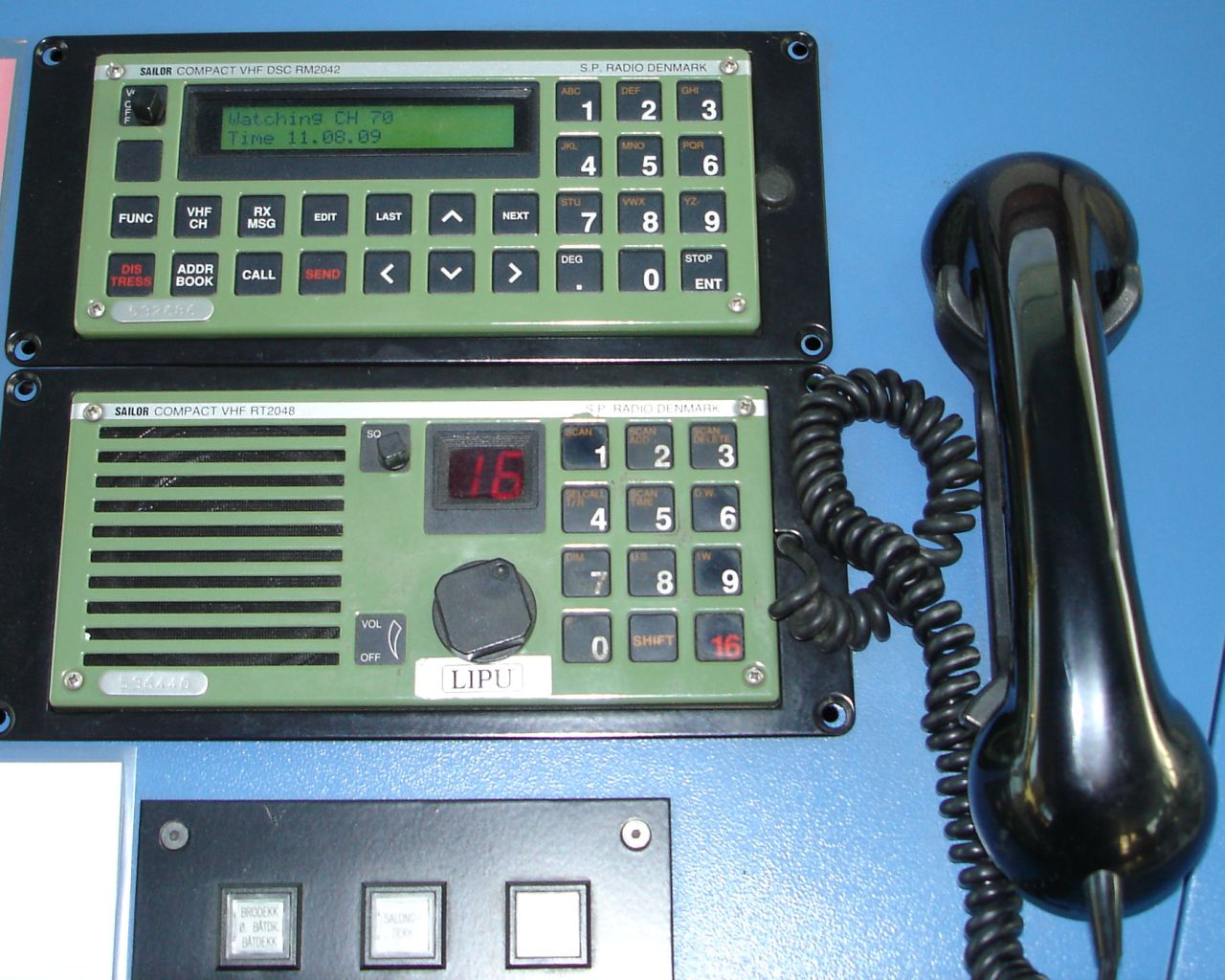
Ship station dedicated to Ship movement service.

Ship movement service (short: SMS; also: ship movement radiocommunication service) is – according to Article 1.31 of the International Telecommunication Union's (ITU) Radio Regulations (RR) – defined as «A safety service in the maritime mobile service other than a port operations service, between coast stations and ship stations, or between ship stations, in which messages are restricted to those relating to the movement of ships. Messages which are of a public correspondence nature shall be excluded from this service.»

See also

== Classification ==
The ITU Radio Regulations classifies this radiocommunication service as follows:
Mobile-satellite service (article 1.25)

- Maritime mobile service (article 1.28)
  - Maritime mobile-satellite service (article 1.29)
  - Port operations service (article 1.30)
  - Ship movement service

== References / sources ==
- International Telecommunication Union (ITU)
