= Ship station =

Radio station operating from a sea vessel

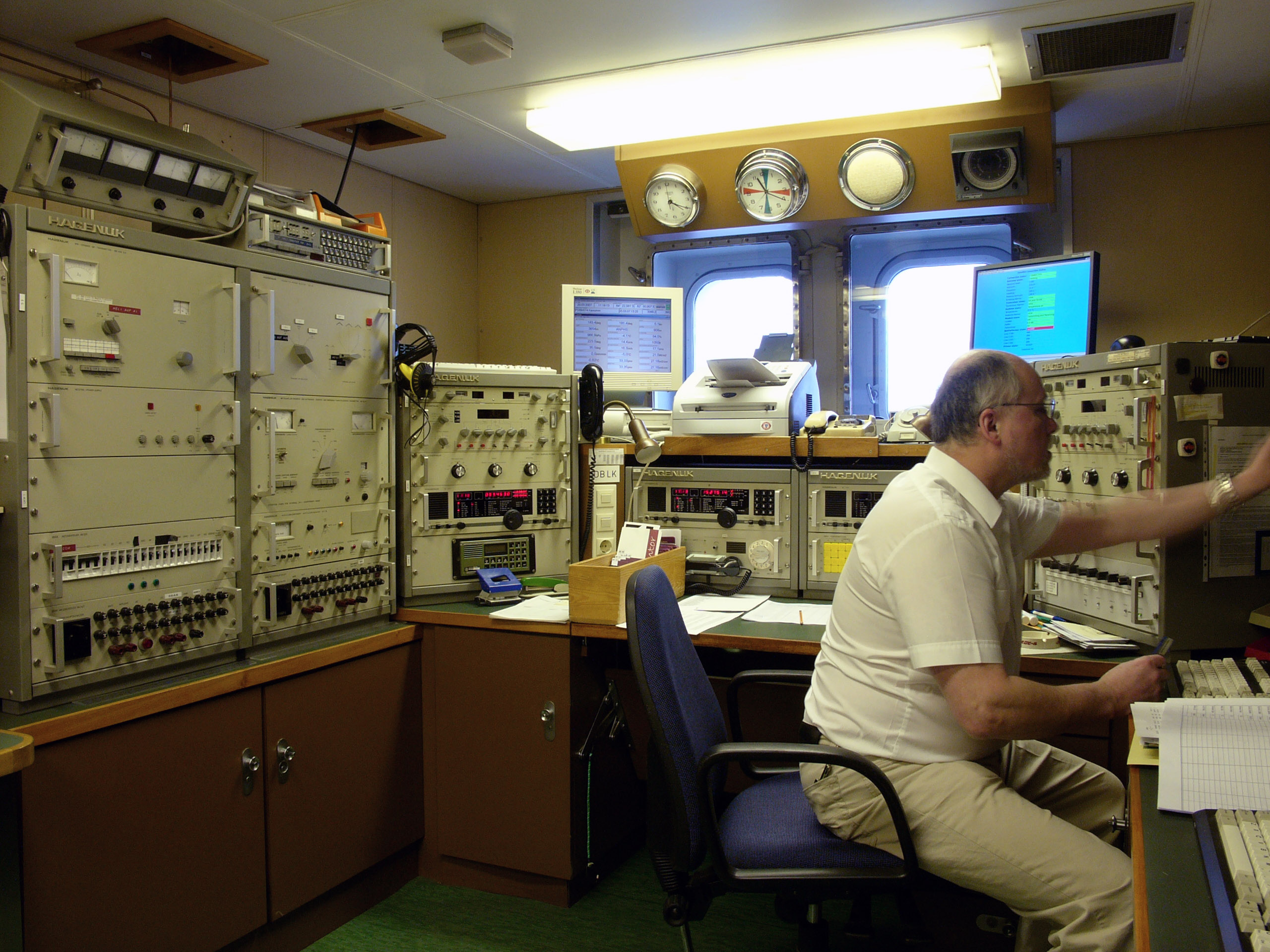
Ship stations (MMS) in the radio-room on board of the German research vessel RV Polarstern

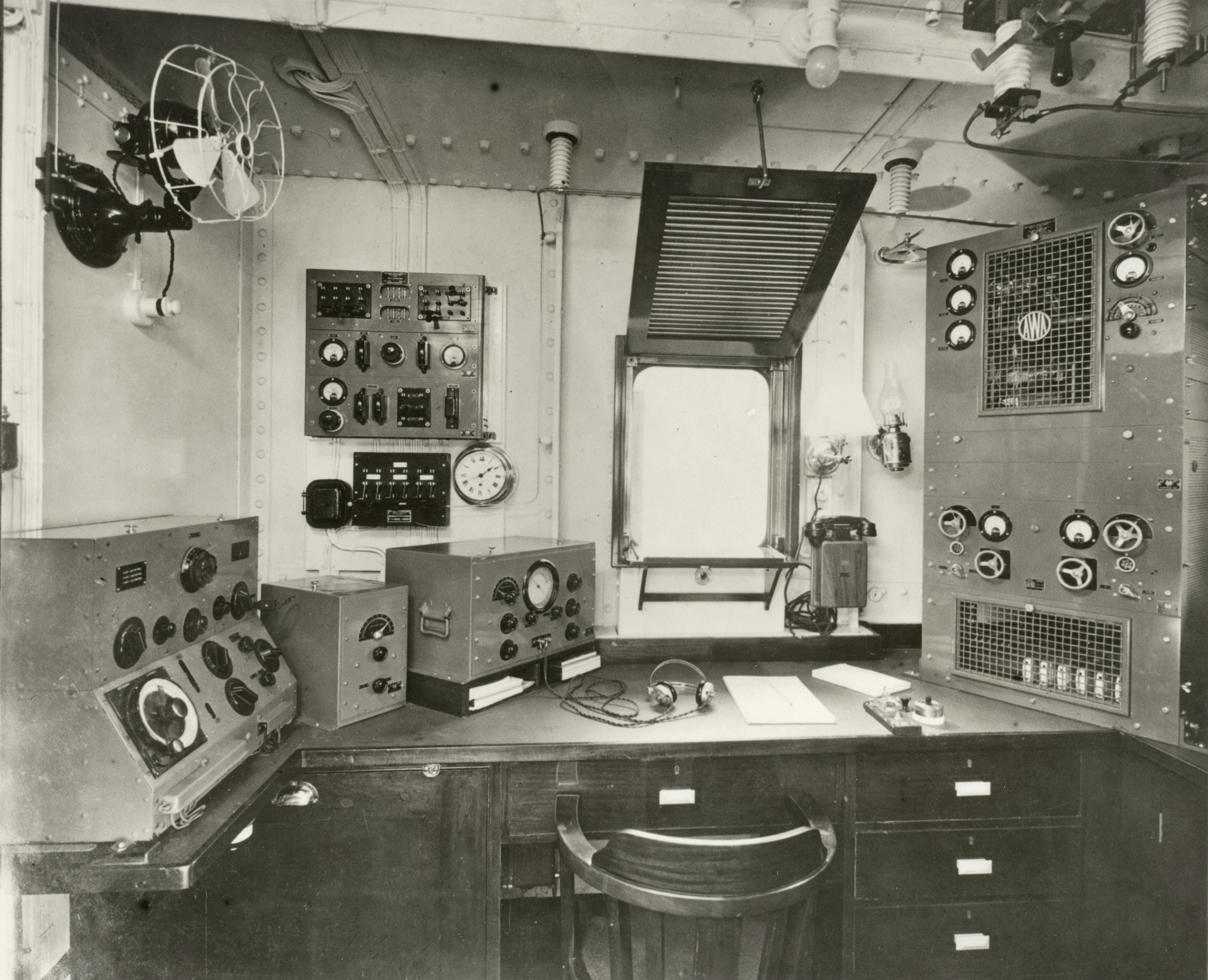
Ship's Radio Room, c. 1935

A ship station (or ship radio station) is a radio station located on board a sea vessel. The ITU Radio Regulations define it as "A mobile station in the maritime mobile service located on board a vessel which is not permanently moored, other than a survival craft station."

Each station is classified by the service in which it operates, permanently or temporarily. Ship station requirements may be established by law or international treaty. For instance large cargo ships traveling the open seas may be required to have long-distance communications equipment, whereas coastal ship may only need short range communications. Operating such stations may require a license.

== Bridge-to-bridge station ==
In telecommunication, a bridge-to-bridge station is a station operating in the port operations service in which messages are restricted to navigational communications and which is capable of operation from the ship's navigational bridge or, in the case of a dredge, from its main control station, operating on a frequency or frequencies in the 156-162 MHz band. bridge-to-bridge operations are a part of the Federal Standard 1037C and the NTIA Manual of Regulations and Procedures for Federal Radio Frequency Management.

== See also ==
- Radio operator, who controls ship stations
- Marine VHF radio
