= Swedish Maritime Administration =

Marine navigation aids, ice breaking, search and rescue

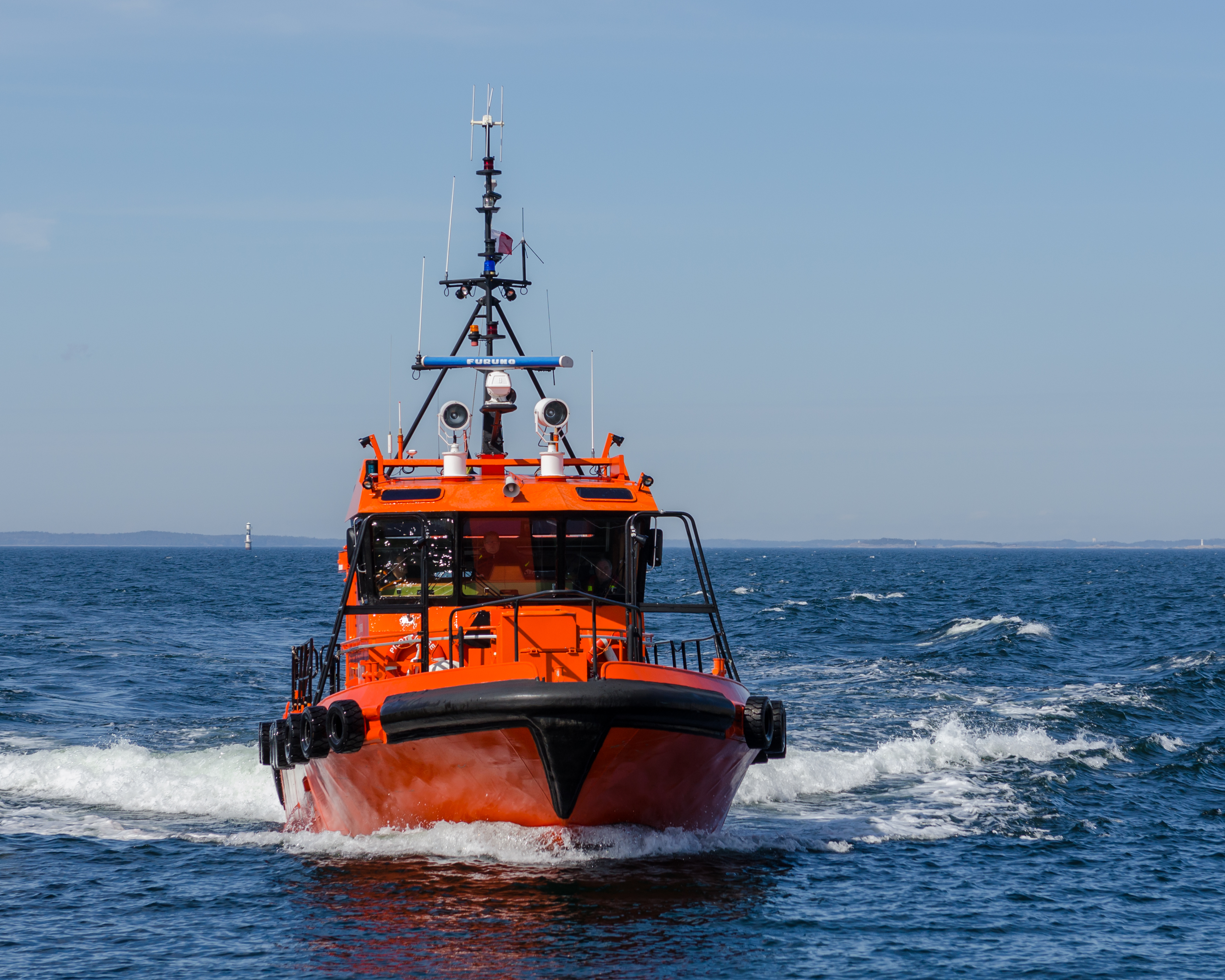
Pilot boat belonging to the Swedish Maritime Administration

The Swedish Maritime Administration (Swedish: Sjöfartsverket) is the government agency in Sweden which provides services to the transport sector by keeping the sea lanes open and safe. The agency is to a certain degree financed through fees levied on commercial shipping.

The head office is in Norrköping.

The main services of the Maritime Administration include: pilotage, maintenance of marine fairways, ice-breaking, hydrographics, maritime search and rescue, seamen's service. It also maintains the lighthouses and other aids to navigation of Sweden. Until 1 January 2009, it also was responsible for maritime safety inspection. Seagoing vessels navigating the Baltic Sea must meet certain ice class requirement. While its mainly deals with merchant shipping, other maritime activities are also taken into account.

Sjöfartsverket runs the Joint Rescue Center Gothenburg.

== History ==
In 1950 the Swedish government appointed an inquiry tasked with investigating how the state's resources in the field of maritime transport could be utilized in the best possible way. At that time, these resources were spread across several different agencies. The inquiry's work led to the creation of a new maritime administration named the National Swedish Board of Pilotage, Lighthouses and Buoys (Swedish: Kungliga Sjöfartsstyrelsen), which was established on 1 January 1956. The agencies that were merged to form the new authority included, among others, the National Swedish Pilotage Service (Swedish: Kungliga Lotsverket) and the National Swedish Hydrographic Office (Service) (Swedish: Kungliga Sjökarteverket). In addition, parts of the National Swedish Road and Hydraulic Engineering Works (Swedish: Kungliga Väg- och Vattenbyggnadsverket), as well as the state's icebreaker operations, the maritime prosecutor, the maritime technical consultant, and the ship inspection office, were transferred to the new agency.

Initially, the agency was divided into the following offices:

- Nautical Office (Nautiska byrån), with the sections Nautical, Editorial Office for Ufs (Underrättelser för sjöfarten — Notices to Mariners), Geomagnetics, and the Director of the Government Ice-breaking Service (Swedish: Statens isbrytardirektör).
- Vessel Office (Fartygsbyrån), responsible for the state's ships and boats and for safety on board Swedish vessels. It had three sections: ship measurement, ship inspection, and operations.
- Legal-Social Office (Juridisk-sociala byrån), which dealt with matters such as accidents, training, and vessel registration.
- Hydrographic Office (Sjökartebyrån), which essentially continued to work in the same manner as when it had previously been the Hydrographic Office.

The authority's premises were located in the former Göta Life Guards' barracks on Linnégatan 87 in Stockholm. However, these were not sufficient for the Hydrographic Office, which therefore remained in its old premises on Skeppsholmen. Not until 1965 did the entire authority move into a joint building. This was located on Sehlstedtsgatan in Gärdet, where the agency remained until 1975, when it moved to Norrköping.

In 1969 the authority was reorganized. Several offices were merged into an operations division, and the Maritime Inspection (Sjöfartsinspektionen) was established. In addition, certain activities were transferred to other authorities, and the agency changed its name to the Swedish Maritime Administration (Swedish: Sjöfartsverket). The next reorganization took place in 1987, when the agency became a public enterprise (affärsverk) and received new organizational divisions. In the early 2000s, the authority Swedish Government Seamen's Service (Handelsflottans kultur- och fritidsråd, HKF) was dissolved, and its activities were taken over by the Swedish Maritime Administration. This includes, among other things, the Swedish Seamen's Library (Svenska sjömansbiblioteket). On 1 January 2009, the Maritime Inspection was transferred from the Swedish Maritime Administration to the new authority, the Swedish Transport Agency.

== See also ==
- List of lighthouses and lightvessels in Sweden
- P2 – Svenskt Vrakskydd
- Sea traffic management
- Swedish Coast Guard
