= On-board communication station =

Service for internal communication aboard a ship

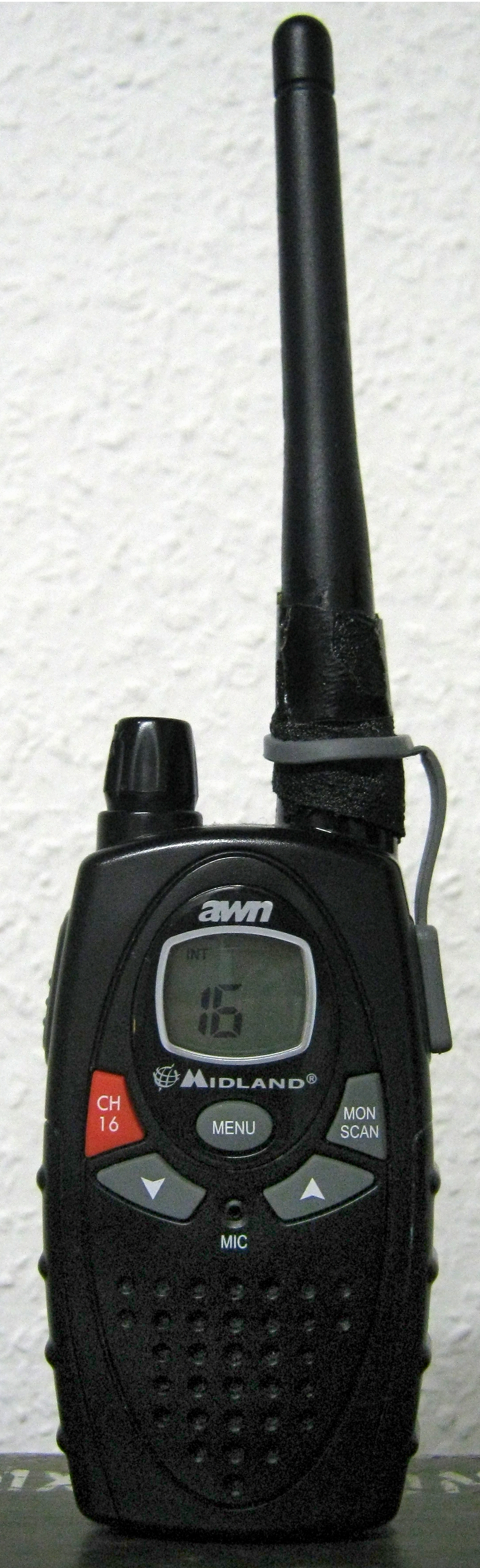
Low power VHF on-board communication station in the maritime mobile service

An on-board communication station or on-board communication radio station is – according to article 1.79 of the International Telecommunication Union's Radio Regulations – "A low-powered mobile station in the maritime mobile service intended for use for internal communications on board a ship, or between a ship and its lifeboats and life-rafts during lifeboat drills or operations, or for communication within a group of vessels being towed or pushed, as well as for line handling and mooring instructions".

Each station shall be classified by the service in which it operates permanently or temporarily.

== See also ==
- Radio station
- Radiocommunication service
