= Ship's emergency transmitter =

Ship's emergency transmitter (also: ship's emergency radio transmitter) is – according to article 1.99 of the International Telecommunication Union's (ITU) ITU Radio Regulations (RR) – defined as «A ship's transmitter to be used exclusively on a distress frequency for distress, urgency or safety purposes.»

Each transmitter shall be classified by the service in which it operates permanently or temporarily.

See also

== References / sources ==
- International Telecommunication Union (ITU)
