= Port operations service =

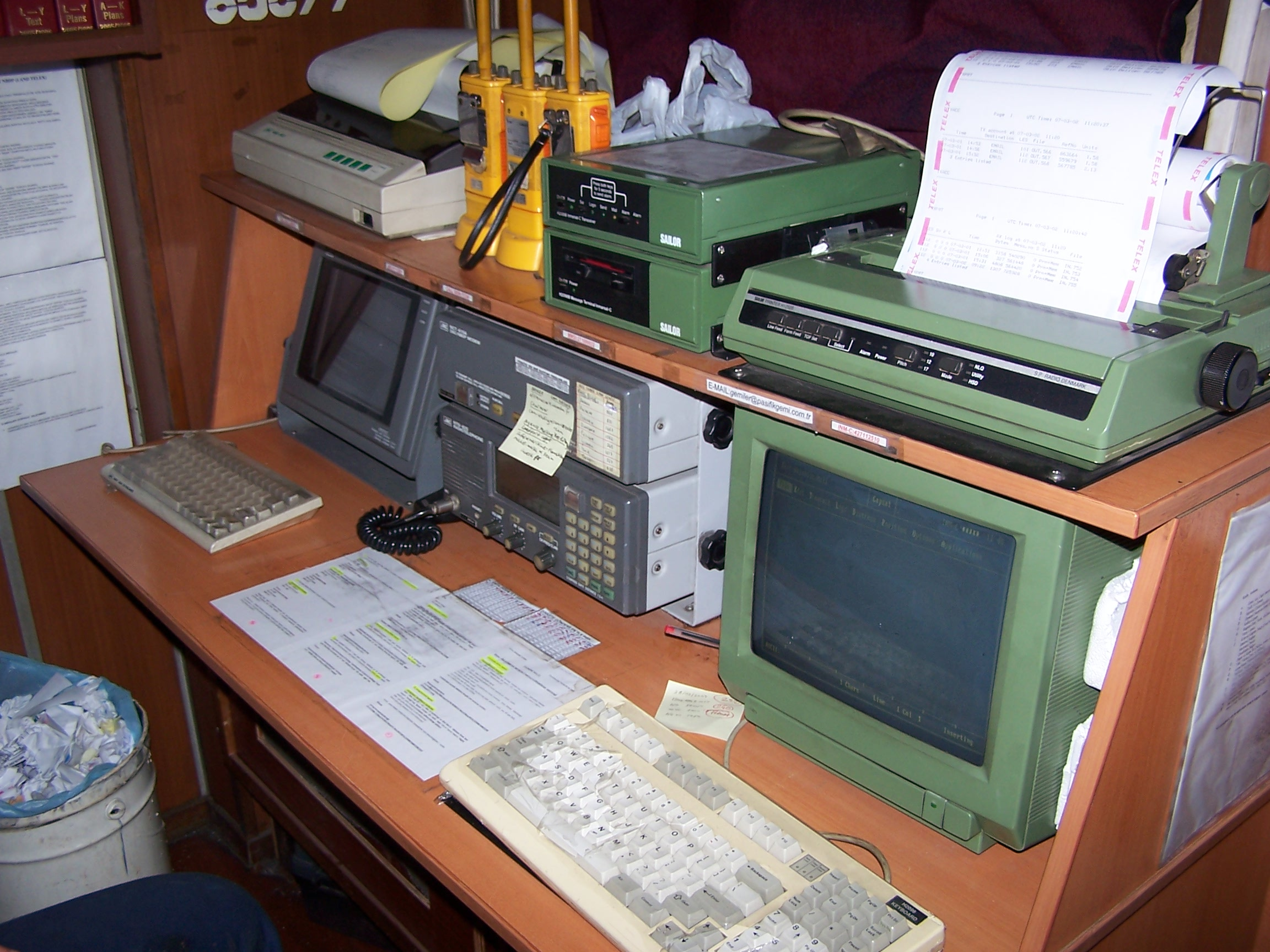
Ship station dedicated to port operation service.

Port operations service (short: POS; also: port operations radiocommunication service') is – according to Article 1.30 of the International Telecommunication Union's (ITU) Radio Regulations (RR) – defined as «A maritime mobile service in or near a port, between coast stations and ship stations, or between ship stations, in which messages are restricted to those relating to the operational handling, the movement and the safety of ships and, in emergency, to the safety of persons. Messages which are of a public correspondence nature shall be excluded from this service.»

See also

== Classification ==
The ITU Radio Regulations classifies this radiocommunication service as follows:
Mobile-satellite service (article 1.25)

- Maritime mobile service (article 1.28)
  - Maritime mobile-satellite service (article 1.29)
  - Port operations service
  - Ship movement service (article 1.31)

== References / sources ==
- International Telecommunication Union (ITU)
