= Survival craft transceiver =

A typical VHF survival craft transceiver

Very high frequency (VHF) survival craft transceivers (SCTs) are lightweight, portable, two-way, handheld VHF transceivers capable of radiotelephone on-scene communication between rescue units and the survival craft. Essentially these are hand-held VHF radios that are used in any survival craft, such as a life boat or life raft. SCTs with re-chargeable type batteries may be used for on-board communications as well.

The International Maritime Organization (IMO) requires the following from SCTs:

- Must be able to be operated by unskilled personnel
- Must be able to transmit and receive on 156.8 MHz (Channel 16) and 156.3 MHz (Channel 6)
- Withstand a drop of 1 meter on a hard surface
- Watertight to a depth of 1 meter for 5 minutes
- Power Minimum of 0.25 watts
- A power reduction switch to less than 1 watt must be available where power exceeds 1 watt
- Antenna must be vertically polarized and omni-directional
- Battery power capacity for 8 hours on a 1:9 duty cycle

The SCTs used for everyday operations have a rechargeable NiCad battery, and some radios that are strictly SCTs use a non-rechargeable lithium battery pack. These batteries must be replaced on or before the manufacturer's marked expiration date. SCTs are required to be capable of radiating a minimum radio frequency (RF) power of 250mW (milliwatts) A switch must be provided on the SCT if the transmitter has a power excess of one watt, this will allow the operator to reduce the power to less than one watt, resulting in a reduced battery power loss. Along with other requirements the IMO has made it mandatory that the antenna be vertically polarized, allowing all radio antennas to be within the same plane, this ensures that the energy transfer from each radio is high. The IMO requires that cargo ships between 300 and 500 gross tons must carry two SCTs. Passenger ships carrying more than 12 passengers on international voyages, and cargo ships of 500 tons or more must carry three SCTs.

== See also ==
- Ship's emergency transmitter
